

356001–356100 

|-bgcolor=#fefefe
| 356001 ||  || — || January 20, 2009 || Kitt Peak || Spacewatch || NYS || align=right data-sort-value="0.86" | 860 m || 
|-id=002 bgcolor=#E9E9E9
| 356002 ||  || — || January 18, 2009 || Mount Lemmon || Mount Lemmon Survey || — || align=right data-sort-value="0.94" | 940 m || 
|-id=003 bgcolor=#E9E9E9
| 356003 ||  || — || January 20, 2009 || Kitt Peak || Spacewatch || — || align=right | 1.5 km || 
|-id=004 bgcolor=#fefefe
| 356004 ||  || — || January 25, 2009 || Catalina || CSS || — || align=right | 1.1 km || 
|-id=005 bgcolor=#E9E9E9
| 356005 ||  || — || January 28, 2009 || Dauban || F. Kugel || — || align=right | 1.4 km || 
|-id=006 bgcolor=#fefefe
| 356006 ||  || — || January 24, 2009 || Purple Mountain || PMO NEO || NYS || align=right data-sort-value="0.66" | 660 m || 
|-id=007 bgcolor=#fefefe
| 356007 ||  || — || January 26, 2009 || Catalina || CSS || — || align=right data-sort-value="0.89" | 890 m || 
|-id=008 bgcolor=#fefefe
| 356008 ||  || — || January 30, 2009 || Socorro || LINEAR || — || align=right | 1.2 km || 
|-id=009 bgcolor=#fefefe
| 356009 ||  || — || January 26, 2009 || Catalina || CSS || V || align=right | 1.0 km || 
|-id=010 bgcolor=#E9E9E9
| 356010 ||  || — || January 29, 2009 || Mount Lemmon || Mount Lemmon Survey || ADE || align=right | 2.6 km || 
|-id=011 bgcolor=#E9E9E9
| 356011 ||  || — || January 25, 2009 || Kitt Peak || Spacewatch || — || align=right | 1.2 km || 
|-id=012 bgcolor=#E9E9E9
| 356012 ||  || — || January 29, 2009 || Kitt Peak || Spacewatch || — || align=right data-sort-value="0.73" | 730 m || 
|-id=013 bgcolor=#E9E9E9
| 356013 ||  || — || January 29, 2009 || Mount Lemmon || Mount Lemmon Survey || — || align=right data-sort-value="0.87" | 870 m || 
|-id=014 bgcolor=#E9E9E9
| 356014 ||  || — || January 31, 2009 || Mount Lemmon || Mount Lemmon Survey || — || align=right data-sort-value="0.92" | 920 m || 
|-id=015 bgcolor=#E9E9E9
| 356015 ||  || — || January 26, 2009 || Purple Mountain || PMO NEO || — || align=right | 1.3 km || 
|-id=016 bgcolor=#fefefe
| 356016 ||  || — || January 28, 2009 || Catalina || CSS || — || align=right | 1.2 km || 
|-id=017 bgcolor=#E9E9E9
| 356017 ||  || — || January 31, 2009 || Mount Lemmon || Mount Lemmon Survey || — || align=right | 2.5 km || 
|-id=018 bgcolor=#E9E9E9
| 356018 ||  || — || January 31, 2009 || Mount Lemmon || Mount Lemmon Survey || — || align=right data-sort-value="0.88" | 880 m || 
|-id=019 bgcolor=#E9E9E9
| 356019 ||  || — || January 29, 2009 || Mount Lemmon || Mount Lemmon Survey || — || align=right | 1.1 km || 
|-id=020 bgcolor=#E9E9E9
| 356020 ||  || — || January 31, 2009 || Kitt Peak || Spacewatch || — || align=right | 1.5 km || 
|-id=021 bgcolor=#fefefe
| 356021 ||  || — || January 29, 2009 || Kitt Peak || Spacewatch || — || align=right | 1.3 km || 
|-id=022 bgcolor=#fefefe
| 356022 ||  || — || January 29, 2009 || Kitt Peak || Spacewatch || — || align=right | 1.0 km || 
|-id=023 bgcolor=#E9E9E9
| 356023 ||  || — || January 29, 2009 || Kitt Peak || Spacewatch || — || align=right | 1.0 km || 
|-id=024 bgcolor=#fefefe
| 356024 ||  || — || January 30, 2009 || Kitt Peak || Spacewatch || — || align=right | 1.0 km || 
|-id=025 bgcolor=#E9E9E9
| 356025 ||  || — || January 30, 2009 || Mount Lemmon || Mount Lemmon Survey || ADE || align=right | 2.1 km || 
|-id=026 bgcolor=#E9E9E9
| 356026 ||  || — || January 31, 2009 || Kitt Peak || Spacewatch || — || align=right data-sort-value="0.66" | 660 m || 
|-id=027 bgcolor=#E9E9E9
| 356027 ||  || — || January 28, 2009 || Catalina || CSS || — || align=right | 1.3 km || 
|-id=028 bgcolor=#E9E9E9
| 356028 ||  || — || January 25, 2009 || Kitt Peak || Spacewatch || — || align=right | 2.3 km || 
|-id=029 bgcolor=#E9E9E9
| 356029 ||  || — || January 31, 2009 || Kitt Peak || Spacewatch || — || align=right data-sort-value="0.89" | 890 m || 
|-id=030 bgcolor=#E9E9E9
| 356030 ||  || — || January 29, 2009 || Catalina || CSS || — || align=right | 1.4 km || 
|-id=031 bgcolor=#E9E9E9
| 356031 ||  || — || December 3, 2008 || Mount Lemmon || Mount Lemmon Survey || — || align=right | 1.0 km || 
|-id=032 bgcolor=#E9E9E9
| 356032 ||  || — || January 31, 2009 || Kitt Peak || Spacewatch || — || align=right data-sort-value="0.79" | 790 m || 
|-id=033 bgcolor=#fefefe
| 356033 ||  || — || January 31, 2009 || Kitt Peak || Spacewatch || V || align=right data-sort-value="0.68" | 680 m || 
|-id=034 bgcolor=#E9E9E9
| 356034 ||  || — || January 25, 2009 || Kitt Peak || Spacewatch || — || align=right | 1.1 km || 
|-id=035 bgcolor=#E9E9E9
| 356035 ||  || — || January 18, 2009 || Mount Lemmon || Mount Lemmon Survey || ADE || align=right | 2.2 km || 
|-id=036 bgcolor=#E9E9E9
| 356036 ||  || — || January 20, 2009 || Catalina || CSS || — || align=right | 1.3 km || 
|-id=037 bgcolor=#E9E9E9
| 356037 ||  || — || January 18, 2009 || Kitt Peak || Spacewatch || — || align=right data-sort-value="0.91" | 910 m || 
|-id=038 bgcolor=#E9E9E9
| 356038 ||  || — || January 20, 2009 || Mount Lemmon || Mount Lemmon Survey || — || align=right data-sort-value="0.86" | 860 m || 
|-id=039 bgcolor=#E9E9E9
| 356039 ||  || — || January 17, 2009 || Mount Lemmon || Mount Lemmon Survey || — || align=right | 1.1 km || 
|-id=040 bgcolor=#fefefe
| 356040 ||  || — || January 18, 2009 || Socorro || LINEAR || — || align=right data-sort-value="0.98" | 980 m || 
|-id=041 bgcolor=#E9E9E9
| 356041 ||  || — || February 1, 2009 || Kitt Peak || Spacewatch || — || align=right data-sort-value="0.80" | 800 m || 
|-id=042 bgcolor=#fefefe
| 356042 ||  || — || February 3, 2009 || Mount Lemmon || Mount Lemmon Survey || — || align=right | 1.3 km || 
|-id=043 bgcolor=#E9E9E9
| 356043 ||  || — || February 1, 2009 || Kitt Peak || Spacewatch || — || align=right | 1.3 km || 
|-id=044 bgcolor=#E9E9E9
| 356044 ||  || — || February 13, 2009 || Kitt Peak || Spacewatch || — || align=right data-sort-value="0.95" | 950 m || 
|-id=045 bgcolor=#fefefe
| 356045 ||  || — || February 13, 2009 || Kitt Peak || Spacewatch || V || align=right data-sort-value="0.86" | 860 m || 
|-id=046 bgcolor=#E9E9E9
| 356046 ||  || — || February 14, 2009 || Kitt Peak || Spacewatch || EUN || align=right | 1.5 km || 
|-id=047 bgcolor=#fefefe
| 356047 ||  || — || February 14, 2009 || Mount Lemmon || Mount Lemmon Survey || — || align=right | 1.1 km || 
|-id=048 bgcolor=#fefefe
| 356048 ||  || — || February 1, 2009 || Kitt Peak || Spacewatch || NYS || align=right data-sort-value="0.89" | 890 m || 
|-id=049 bgcolor=#fefefe
| 356049 ||  || — || February 3, 2009 || Kitt Peak || Spacewatch || NYS || align=right data-sort-value="0.81" | 810 m || 
|-id=050 bgcolor=#E9E9E9
| 356050 ||  || — || February 5, 2009 || Mount Lemmon || Mount Lemmon Survey || — || align=right | 1.6 km || 
|-id=051 bgcolor=#fefefe
| 356051 ||  || — || February 3, 2009 || Kitt Peak || Spacewatch || NYS || align=right data-sort-value="0.80" | 800 m || 
|-id=052 bgcolor=#E9E9E9
| 356052 ||  || — || February 4, 2009 || Mount Lemmon || Mount Lemmon Survey || — || align=right | 1.8 km || 
|-id=053 bgcolor=#E9E9E9
| 356053 ||  || — || February 20, 2009 || Cordell-Lorenz || D. T. Durig || — || align=right data-sort-value="0.90" | 900 m || 
|-id=054 bgcolor=#E9E9E9
| 356054 ||  || — || February 20, 2009 || Cordell-Lorenz || D. T. Durig || — || align=right data-sort-value="0.97" | 970 m || 
|-id=055 bgcolor=#E9E9E9
| 356055 ||  || — || February 1, 2009 || Catalina || CSS || ADE || align=right | 2.4 km || 
|-id=056 bgcolor=#E9E9E9
| 356056 ||  || — || February 16, 2009 || Kitt Peak || Spacewatch || — || align=right data-sort-value="0.84" | 840 m || 
|-id=057 bgcolor=#E9E9E9
| 356057 ||  || — || February 21, 2009 || Mount Lemmon || Mount Lemmon Survey || — || align=right data-sort-value="0.96" | 960 m || 
|-id=058 bgcolor=#E9E9E9
| 356058 ||  || — || February 22, 2009 || Calar Alto || F. Hormuth || — || align=right | 1.9 km || 
|-id=059 bgcolor=#E9E9E9
| 356059 ||  || — || February 1, 2009 || Mount Lemmon || Mount Lemmon Survey || EUN || align=right | 1.3 km || 
|-id=060 bgcolor=#E9E9E9
| 356060 ||  || — || February 20, 2009 || Kitt Peak || Spacewatch || — || align=right | 2.7 km || 
|-id=061 bgcolor=#E9E9E9
| 356061 ||  || — || February 1, 2009 || Kitt Peak || Spacewatch || — || align=right | 1.5 km || 
|-id=062 bgcolor=#E9E9E9
| 356062 ||  || — || February 19, 2009 || La Sagra || OAM Obs. || — || align=right | 1.7 km || 
|-id=063 bgcolor=#E9E9E9
| 356063 ||  || — || February 19, 2009 || Kitt Peak || Spacewatch || — || align=right | 1.9 km || 
|-id=064 bgcolor=#E9E9E9
| 356064 ||  || — || January 31, 2009 || Mount Lemmon || Mount Lemmon Survey || EUN || align=right | 1.4 km || 
|-id=065 bgcolor=#E9E9E9
| 356065 ||  || — || February 21, 2009 || Mount Lemmon || Mount Lemmon Survey || MAR || align=right data-sort-value="0.94" | 940 m || 
|-id=066 bgcolor=#E9E9E9
| 356066 ||  || — || February 22, 2009 || Kitt Peak || Spacewatch || — || align=right | 1.2 km || 
|-id=067 bgcolor=#E9E9E9
| 356067 ||  || — || February 22, 2009 || Mount Lemmon || Mount Lemmon Survey || HEN || align=right data-sort-value="0.83" | 830 m || 
|-id=068 bgcolor=#E9E9E9
| 356068 ||  || — || February 22, 2009 || Kitt Peak || Spacewatch || — || align=right | 2.4 km || 
|-id=069 bgcolor=#E9E9E9
| 356069 ||  || — || March 8, 2005 || Mount Lemmon || Mount Lemmon Survey || — || align=right | 1.4 km || 
|-id=070 bgcolor=#E9E9E9
| 356070 ||  || — || February 19, 2009 || Kitt Peak || Spacewatch || — || align=right | 1.1 km || 
|-id=071 bgcolor=#E9E9E9
| 356071 ||  || — || February 23, 2009 || La Sagra || OAM Obs. || — || align=right | 1.2 km || 
|-id=072 bgcolor=#fefefe
| 356072 ||  || — || February 25, 2009 || Catalina || CSS || — || align=right data-sort-value="0.83" | 830 m || 
|-id=073 bgcolor=#E9E9E9
| 356073 ||  || — || February 24, 2009 || Kitt Peak || Spacewatch || — || align=right | 2.6 km || 
|-id=074 bgcolor=#E9E9E9
| 356074 ||  || — || February 27, 2009 || Kitt Peak || Spacewatch || — || align=right | 1.3 km || 
|-id=075 bgcolor=#E9E9E9
| 356075 ||  || — || February 28, 2009 || Mount Lemmon || Mount Lemmon Survey || — || align=right | 1.6 km || 
|-id=076 bgcolor=#E9E9E9
| 356076 ||  || — || February 26, 2009 || Kitt Peak || Spacewatch || — || align=right | 2.8 km || 
|-id=077 bgcolor=#E9E9E9
| 356077 ||  || — || February 26, 2009 || Kitt Peak || Spacewatch || — || align=right data-sort-value="0.94" | 940 m || 
|-id=078 bgcolor=#E9E9E9
| 356078 ||  || — || February 26, 2009 || Kitt Peak || Spacewatch || — || align=right | 1.2 km || 
|-id=079 bgcolor=#E9E9E9
| 356079 ||  || — || February 22, 2009 || Kitt Peak || Spacewatch || — || align=right | 1.1 km || 
|-id=080 bgcolor=#E9E9E9
| 356080 ||  || — || November 20, 2003 || Catalina || CSS || — || align=right | 1.9 km || 
|-id=081 bgcolor=#E9E9E9
| 356081 ||  || — || February 26, 2009 || Kitt Peak || Spacewatch || HOF || align=right | 2.7 km || 
|-id=082 bgcolor=#E9E9E9
| 356082 ||  || — || March 1, 2005 || Catalina || CSS || JUL || align=right | 1.5 km || 
|-id=083 bgcolor=#E9E9E9
| 356083 ||  || — || February 27, 2009 || Kitt Peak || Spacewatch || — || align=right | 1.1 km || 
|-id=084 bgcolor=#E9E9E9
| 356084 ||  || — || February 27, 2009 || Kitt Peak || Spacewatch || — || align=right | 2.1 km || 
|-id=085 bgcolor=#E9E9E9
| 356085 ||  || — || February 13, 2009 || Kitt Peak || Spacewatch || JUN || align=right | 1.2 km || 
|-id=086 bgcolor=#E9E9E9
| 356086 ||  || — || February 21, 2009 || Kitt Peak || Spacewatch || — || align=right | 2.2 km || 
|-id=087 bgcolor=#fefefe
| 356087 ||  || — || February 20, 2009 || Mount Lemmon || Mount Lemmon Survey || V || align=right data-sort-value="0.85" | 850 m || 
|-id=088 bgcolor=#E9E9E9
| 356088 ||  || — || February 27, 2009 || Kitt Peak || Spacewatch || — || align=right | 1.5 km || 
|-id=089 bgcolor=#E9E9E9
| 356089 ||  || — || February 27, 2009 || Kitt Peak || Spacewatch || — || align=right | 2.4 km || 
|-id=090 bgcolor=#E9E9E9
| 356090 ||  || — || February 19, 2009 || Catalina || CSS || — || align=right | 1.0 km || 
|-id=091 bgcolor=#E9E9E9
| 356091 ||  || — || February 19, 2009 || Kitt Peak || Spacewatch || — || align=right | 1.1 km || 
|-id=092 bgcolor=#E9E9E9
| 356092 ||  || — || February 19, 2009 || Catalina || CSS || — || align=right | 1.2 km || 
|-id=093 bgcolor=#E9E9E9
| 356093 ||  || — || February 20, 2009 || Kitt Peak || Spacewatch || — || align=right | 2.1 km || 
|-id=094 bgcolor=#E9E9E9
| 356094 ||  || — || February 20, 2009 || Kitt Peak || Spacewatch || AGN || align=right | 1.1 km || 
|-id=095 bgcolor=#E9E9E9
| 356095 ||  || — || February 27, 2009 || Kitt Peak || Spacewatch || MRX || align=right | 1.2 km || 
|-id=096 bgcolor=#E9E9E9
| 356096 ||  || — || March 15, 2009 || La Sagra || OAM Obs. || — || align=right | 2.3 km || 
|-id=097 bgcolor=#E9E9E9
| 356097 ||  || — || March 15, 2009 || La Sagra || OAM Obs. || — || align=right | 2.3 km || 
|-id=098 bgcolor=#E9E9E9
| 356098 ||  || — || February 19, 2009 || La Sagra || OAM Obs. || — || align=right | 1.7 km || 
|-id=099 bgcolor=#E9E9E9
| 356099 ||  || — || March 8, 2009 || Mount Lemmon || Mount Lemmon Survey || — || align=right | 2.1 km || 
|-id=100 bgcolor=#E9E9E9
| 356100 ||  || — || March 15, 2009 || Kitt Peak || Spacewatch || — || align=right | 2.0 km || 
|}

356101–356200 

|-bgcolor=#E9E9E9
| 356101 ||  || — || March 5, 2009 || Siding Spring || SSS || — || align=right | 1.1 km || 
|-id=102 bgcolor=#E9E9E9
| 356102 ||  || — || March 3, 2009 || Kitt Peak || Spacewatch || — || align=right | 1.7 km || 
|-id=103 bgcolor=#d6d6d6
| 356103 ||  || — || March 3, 2009 || Kitt Peak || Spacewatch || — || align=right | 3.2 km || 
|-id=104 bgcolor=#E9E9E9
| 356104 ||  || — || March 18, 2009 || Taunus || S. Karge, E. Schwab || — || align=right | 1.0 km || 
|-id=105 bgcolor=#E9E9E9
| 356105 ||  || — || March 16, 2009 || Kitt Peak || Spacewatch || — || align=right | 1.7 km || 
|-id=106 bgcolor=#E9E9E9
| 356106 ||  || — || February 24, 2009 || Kitt Peak || Spacewatch || AGN || align=right | 1.4 km || 
|-id=107 bgcolor=#E9E9E9
| 356107 ||  || — || December 30, 2008 || Mount Lemmon || Mount Lemmon Survey || MAR || align=right | 1.0 km || 
|-id=108 bgcolor=#E9E9E9
| 356108 ||  || — || March 16, 2009 || Kitt Peak || Spacewatch || — || align=right | 1.5 km || 
|-id=109 bgcolor=#E9E9E9
| 356109 ||  || — || March 18, 2009 || La Sagra || OAM Obs. || — || align=right | 1.1 km || 
|-id=110 bgcolor=#fefefe
| 356110 ||  || — || March 21, 2009 || Dauban || F. Kugel || V || align=right data-sort-value="0.83" | 830 m || 
|-id=111 bgcolor=#E9E9E9
| 356111 ||  || — || March 17, 2009 || Bergisch Gladbach || W. Bickel || — || align=right | 1.0 km || 
|-id=112 bgcolor=#E9E9E9
| 356112 ||  || — || March 18, 2009 || Kitt Peak || Spacewatch || — || align=right | 1.9 km || 
|-id=113 bgcolor=#E9E9E9
| 356113 ||  || — || March 19, 2009 || Catalina || CSS || JUN || align=right | 1.3 km || 
|-id=114 bgcolor=#E9E9E9
| 356114 ||  || — || March 21, 2009 || Mount Lemmon || Mount Lemmon Survey || — || align=right | 1.9 km || 
|-id=115 bgcolor=#E9E9E9
| 356115 ||  || — || March 21, 2009 || Mount Lemmon || Mount Lemmon Survey || — || align=right data-sort-value="0.88" | 880 m || 
|-id=116 bgcolor=#E9E9E9
| 356116 ||  || — || March 22, 2009 || La Sagra || OAM Obs. || EUN || align=right | 1.3 km || 
|-id=117 bgcolor=#E9E9E9
| 356117 ||  || — || March 18, 2009 || Catalina || CSS || — || align=right | 1.1 km || 
|-id=118 bgcolor=#E9E9E9
| 356118 ||  || — || June 4, 2005 || Kitt Peak || Spacewatch || HOF || align=right | 2.8 km || 
|-id=119 bgcolor=#E9E9E9
| 356119 ||  || — || March 19, 2009 || La Sagra || OAM Obs. || JUN || align=right | 1.3 km || 
|-id=120 bgcolor=#E9E9E9
| 356120 ||  || — || March 25, 2009 || La Sagra || OAM Obs. || JUN || align=right | 1.1 km || 
|-id=121 bgcolor=#E9E9E9
| 356121 ||  || — || March 21, 2009 || Catalina || CSS || — || align=right | 1.2 km || 
|-id=122 bgcolor=#E9E9E9
| 356122 ||  || — || March 22, 2009 || Mount Lemmon || Mount Lemmon Survey || — || align=right data-sort-value="0.88" | 880 m || 
|-id=123 bgcolor=#E9E9E9
| 356123 ||  || — || March 24, 2009 || Mount Lemmon || Mount Lemmon Survey || — || align=right | 2.6 km || 
|-id=124 bgcolor=#E9E9E9
| 356124 ||  || — || March 22, 2009 || Catalina || CSS || JUN || align=right | 1.4 km || 
|-id=125 bgcolor=#E9E9E9
| 356125 ||  || — || March 28, 2009 || Kitt Peak || Spacewatch || — || align=right | 1.7 km || 
|-id=126 bgcolor=#E9E9E9
| 356126 ||  || — || March 1, 2009 || Kitt Peak || Spacewatch || AGN || align=right | 1.4 km || 
|-id=127 bgcolor=#E9E9E9
| 356127 ||  || — || February 1, 2009 || Mount Lemmon || Mount Lemmon Survey || — || align=right | 2.1 km || 
|-id=128 bgcolor=#E9E9E9
| 356128 ||  || — || March 27, 2009 || Kitt Peak || Spacewatch || — || align=right | 1.9 km || 
|-id=129 bgcolor=#E9E9E9
| 356129 ||  || — || March 28, 2009 || Kitt Peak || Spacewatch || AEO || align=right | 1.5 km || 
|-id=130 bgcolor=#E9E9E9
| 356130 ||  || — || March 16, 2009 || Mount Lemmon || Mount Lemmon Survey || — || align=right data-sort-value="0.98" | 980 m || 
|-id=131 bgcolor=#E9E9E9
| 356131 ||  || — || March 31, 2009 || Kitt Peak || Spacewatch || — || align=right | 1.7 km || 
|-id=132 bgcolor=#E9E9E9
| 356132 ||  || — || March 26, 2009 || La Sagra || OAM Obs. || JUN || align=right | 1.4 km || 
|-id=133 bgcolor=#E9E9E9
| 356133 ||  || — || March 19, 2009 || Catalina || CSS || — || align=right | 2.2 km || 
|-id=134 bgcolor=#E9E9E9
| 356134 ||  || — || August 27, 2006 || Kitt Peak || Spacewatch || — || align=right | 2.0 km || 
|-id=135 bgcolor=#E9E9E9
| 356135 ||  || — || March 17, 2009 || Kitt Peak || Spacewatch || — || align=right | 2.2 km || 
|-id=136 bgcolor=#E9E9E9
| 356136 ||  || — || March 16, 2009 || Mount Lemmon || Mount Lemmon Survey || — || align=right | 2.1 km || 
|-id=137 bgcolor=#E9E9E9
| 356137 ||  || — || October 8, 2007 || Mount Lemmon || Mount Lemmon Survey || JUN || align=right data-sort-value="0.89" | 890 m || 
|-id=138 bgcolor=#E9E9E9
| 356138 ||  || — || October 9, 2007 || Kitt Peak || Spacewatch || — || align=right | 1.8 km || 
|-id=139 bgcolor=#E9E9E9
| 356139 ||  || — || March 19, 2009 || Mount Lemmon || Mount Lemmon Survey || — || align=right | 1.5 km || 
|-id=140 bgcolor=#E9E9E9
| 356140 ||  || — || March 21, 2009 || Kitt Peak || Spacewatch || — || align=right | 1.5 km || 
|-id=141 bgcolor=#E9E9E9
| 356141 ||  || — || March 18, 2009 || Kitt Peak || Spacewatch || RAF || align=right | 1.3 km || 
|-id=142 bgcolor=#d6d6d6
| 356142 ||  || — || March 25, 2009 || Mount Lemmon || Mount Lemmon Survey || EOS || align=right | 2.1 km || 
|-id=143 bgcolor=#E9E9E9
| 356143 ||  || — || March 18, 2009 || Catalina || CSS || JUN || align=right | 1.3 km || 
|-id=144 bgcolor=#E9E9E9
| 356144 ||  || — || March 24, 2009 || Mount Lemmon || Mount Lemmon Survey || — || align=right | 1.5 km || 
|-id=145 bgcolor=#E9E9E9
| 356145 ||  || — || March 16, 2009 || Kitt Peak || Spacewatch || — || align=right | 2.6 km || 
|-id=146 bgcolor=#E9E9E9
| 356146 ||  || — || April 12, 2009 || Altschwendt || W. Ries || — || align=right | 1.7 km || 
|-id=147 bgcolor=#d6d6d6
| 356147 ||  || — || April 3, 2009 || Cerro Burek || Alianza S4 Obs. || — || align=right | 3.2 km || 
|-id=148 bgcolor=#E9E9E9
| 356148 ||  || — || November 11, 2007 || Mount Lemmon || Mount Lemmon Survey || HOF || align=right | 2.6 km || 
|-id=149 bgcolor=#E9E9E9
| 356149 ||  || — || April 16, 2009 || Catalina || CSS || EUN || align=right | 1.6 km || 
|-id=150 bgcolor=#E9E9E9
| 356150 ||  || — || March 29, 2009 || Mount Lemmon || Mount Lemmon Survey || — || align=right | 3.1 km || 
|-id=151 bgcolor=#E9E9E9
| 356151 ||  || — || March 17, 2009 || Kitt Peak || Spacewatch || — || align=right | 2.4 km || 
|-id=152 bgcolor=#d6d6d6
| 356152 ||  || — || April 18, 2009 || Catalina || CSS || — || align=right | 3.8 km || 
|-id=153 bgcolor=#E9E9E9
| 356153 ||  || — || April 16, 2009 || Piszkéstető || K. Sárneczky || WIT || align=right data-sort-value="0.86" | 860 m || 
|-id=154 bgcolor=#E9E9E9
| 356154 ||  || — || April 18, 2009 || Piszkéstető || K. Sárneczky || — || align=right data-sort-value="0.98" | 980 m || 
|-id=155 bgcolor=#E9E9E9
| 356155 ||  || — || April 17, 2009 || Kitt Peak || Spacewatch || — || align=right | 3.5 km || 
|-id=156 bgcolor=#E9E9E9
| 356156 ||  || — || March 21, 2009 || Catalina || CSS || — || align=right | 3.0 km || 
|-id=157 bgcolor=#E9E9E9
| 356157 ||  || — || April 20, 2009 || Tzec Maun || F. Tozzi || — || align=right | 2.3 km || 
|-id=158 bgcolor=#E9E9E9
| 356158 ||  || — || April 19, 2009 || Kitt Peak || Spacewatch || — || align=right | 1.9 km || 
|-id=159 bgcolor=#E9E9E9
| 356159 ||  || — || April 19, 2009 || Kitt Peak || Spacewatch || — || align=right | 1.2 km || 
|-id=160 bgcolor=#E9E9E9
| 356160 ||  || — || April 19, 2009 || Kitt Peak || Spacewatch || HNS || align=right | 1.3 km || 
|-id=161 bgcolor=#E9E9E9
| 356161 ||  || — || April 20, 2009 || Mount Lemmon || Mount Lemmon Survey || — || align=right | 2.3 km || 
|-id=162 bgcolor=#E9E9E9
| 356162 ||  || — || April 21, 2009 || La Sagra || OAM Obs. || — || align=right | 1.8 km || 
|-id=163 bgcolor=#E9E9E9
| 356163 ||  || — || April 17, 2009 || Catalina || CSS || — || align=right | 3.0 km || 
|-id=164 bgcolor=#E9E9E9
| 356164 ||  || — || April 20, 2009 || Kitt Peak || Spacewatch || — || align=right | 2.9 km || 
|-id=165 bgcolor=#E9E9E9
| 356165 ||  || — || April 21, 2009 || La Sagra || OAM Obs. || — || align=right | 2.0 km || 
|-id=166 bgcolor=#E9E9E9
| 356166 ||  || — || April 19, 2009 || Kitt Peak || Spacewatch || JUN || align=right | 1.1 km || 
|-id=167 bgcolor=#d6d6d6
| 356167 ||  || — || April 19, 2009 || Kitt Peak || Spacewatch || — || align=right | 3.3 km || 
|-id=168 bgcolor=#E9E9E9
| 356168 ||  || — || April 22, 2009 || Kitt Peak || Spacewatch || — || align=right | 2.0 km || 
|-id=169 bgcolor=#E9E9E9
| 356169 ||  || — || April 20, 2009 || Catalina || CSS || — || align=right | 2.2 km || 
|-id=170 bgcolor=#d6d6d6
| 356170 ||  || — || April 22, 2009 || Mount Lemmon || Mount Lemmon Survey || KOR || align=right | 1.5 km || 
|-id=171 bgcolor=#E9E9E9
| 356171 ||  || — || April 18, 2009 || Catalina || CSS || — || align=right | 2.2 km || 
|-id=172 bgcolor=#E9E9E9
| 356172 ||  || — || April 20, 2009 || Catalina || CSS || — || align=right | 2.8 km || 
|-id=173 bgcolor=#E9E9E9
| 356173 ||  || — || April 25, 2009 || Purple Mountain || PMO NEO || JUN || align=right | 1.3 km || 
|-id=174 bgcolor=#E9E9E9
| 356174 ||  || — || April 28, 2009 || Catalina || CSS || — || align=right | 2.7 km || 
|-id=175 bgcolor=#E9E9E9
| 356175 ||  || — || April 26, 2009 || Kitt Peak || Spacewatch || GEF || align=right | 1.2 km || 
|-id=176 bgcolor=#E9E9E9
| 356176 ||  || — || March 25, 2009 || Mount Lemmon || Mount Lemmon Survey || — || align=right | 2.3 km || 
|-id=177 bgcolor=#E9E9E9
| 356177 ||  || — || April 27, 2009 || Catalina || CSS || — || align=right | 2.6 km || 
|-id=178 bgcolor=#E9E9E9
| 356178 ||  || — || March 16, 2009 || Kitt Peak || Spacewatch || — || align=right | 1.4 km || 
|-id=179 bgcolor=#E9E9E9
| 356179 ||  || — || April 18, 2009 || Kitt Peak || Spacewatch || — || align=right | 2.7 km || 
|-id=180 bgcolor=#d6d6d6
| 356180 ||  || — || April 23, 2009 || Kitt Peak || Spacewatch || — || align=right | 2.4 km || 
|-id=181 bgcolor=#E9E9E9
| 356181 ||  || — || April 27, 2009 || Kitt Peak || Spacewatch || — || align=right | 2.1 km || 
|-id=182 bgcolor=#d6d6d6
| 356182 ||  || — || November 15, 2006 || Kitt Peak || Spacewatch || — || align=right | 3.1 km || 
|-id=183 bgcolor=#d6d6d6
| 356183 ||  || — || April 17, 2009 || Kitt Peak || Spacewatch || EOS || align=right | 1.8 km || 
|-id=184 bgcolor=#d6d6d6
| 356184 ||  || — || April 26, 2009 || Kitt Peak || Spacewatch || — || align=right | 2.9 km || 
|-id=185 bgcolor=#d6d6d6
| 356185 ||  || — || May 13, 2009 || Kitt Peak || Spacewatch || — || align=right | 2.7 km || 
|-id=186 bgcolor=#E9E9E9
| 356186 ||  || — || May 14, 2009 || Kitt Peak || Spacewatch || EUN || align=right | 1.5 km || 
|-id=187 bgcolor=#E9E9E9
| 356187 ||  || — || May 15, 2009 || Catalina || CSS || — || align=right | 2.5 km || 
|-id=188 bgcolor=#E9E9E9
| 356188 ||  || — || May 6, 2009 || Siding Spring || SSS || — || align=right | 2.7 km || 
|-id=189 bgcolor=#d6d6d6
| 356189 ||  || — || May 26, 2009 || La Sagra || OAM Obs. || — || align=right | 4.5 km || 
|-id=190 bgcolor=#d6d6d6
| 356190 ||  || — || May 25, 2009 || Kitt Peak || Spacewatch || — || align=right | 2.9 km || 
|-id=191 bgcolor=#E9E9E9
| 356191 ||  || — || May 16, 2009 || Mount Lemmon || Mount Lemmon Survey || — || align=right | 2.8 km || 
|-id=192 bgcolor=#d6d6d6
| 356192 ||  || — || May 17, 2009 || Mount Lemmon || Mount Lemmon Survey || — || align=right | 4.1 km || 
|-id=193 bgcolor=#d6d6d6
| 356193 ||  || — || February 12, 2008 || Mount Lemmon || Mount Lemmon Survey || — || align=right | 3.5 km || 
|-id=194 bgcolor=#d6d6d6
| 356194 ||  || — || June 14, 2009 || Kitt Peak || Spacewatch || — || align=right | 2.9 km || 
|-id=195 bgcolor=#d6d6d6
| 356195 ||  || — || June 24, 2009 || Mount Lemmon || Mount Lemmon Survey || — || align=right | 3.9 km || 
|-id=196 bgcolor=#d6d6d6
| 356196 || 2009 OX || — || July 18, 2009 || Hibiscus || N. Teamo || — || align=right | 3.7 km || 
|-id=197 bgcolor=#d6d6d6
| 356197 ||  || — || July 16, 2009 || La Sagra || OAM Obs. || — || align=right | 4.0 km || 
|-id=198 bgcolor=#d6d6d6
| 356198 ||  || — || July 23, 2009 || La Sagra || OAM Obs. || LUT || align=right | 5.5 km || 
|-id=199 bgcolor=#d6d6d6
| 356199 ||  || — || January 26, 2007 || Kitt Peak || Spacewatch || LIX || align=right | 4.1 km || 
|-id=200 bgcolor=#d6d6d6
| 356200 ||  || — || February 13, 2001 || Kitt Peak || Spacewatch || — || align=right | 4.9 km || 
|}

356201–356300 

|-bgcolor=#d6d6d6
| 356201 ||  || — || August 15, 2009 || Kitt Peak || Spacewatch || — || align=right | 2.5 km || 
|-id=202 bgcolor=#d6d6d6
| 356202 ||  || — || August 15, 2009 || Catalina || CSS || — || align=right | 4.0 km || 
|-id=203 bgcolor=#d6d6d6
| 356203 ||  || — || August 24, 2009 || Črni Vrh || Črni Vrh || EUP || align=right | 4.6 km || 
|-id=204 bgcolor=#d6d6d6
| 356204 ||  || — || August 16, 2009 || Catalina || CSS || — || align=right | 4.2 km || 
|-id=205 bgcolor=#C2FFFF
| 356205 ||  || — || January 16, 2012 || Les Engarouines || L. Bernasconi || L4 || align=right | 10 km || 
|-id=206 bgcolor=#C2FFFF
| 356206 ||  || — || September 12, 2009 || Kitt Peak || Spacewatch || L4 || align=right | 9.3 km || 
|-id=207 bgcolor=#C2FFFF
| 356207 ||  || — || September 14, 2009 || Kitt Peak || Spacewatch || L4 || align=right | 8.9 km || 
|-id=208 bgcolor=#C2FFFF
| 356208 ||  || — || June 22, 2007 || Kitt Peak || Spacewatch || L4 || align=right | 13 km || 
|-id=209 bgcolor=#C2FFFF
| 356209 ||  || — || September 14, 2009 || Kitt Peak || Spacewatch || L4 || align=right | 10 km || 
|-id=210 bgcolor=#C2FFFF
| 356210 ||  || — || September 14, 2009 || Kitt Peak || Spacewatch || L4 || align=right | 8.9 km || 
|-id=211 bgcolor=#C2FFFF
| 356211 ||  || — || September 12, 2009 || Kitt Peak || Spacewatch || L4ERY || align=right | 7.8 km || 
|-id=212 bgcolor=#C2FFFF
| 356212 ||  || — || September 15, 2009 || Kitt Peak || Spacewatch || L4 || align=right | 8.2 km || 
|-id=213 bgcolor=#C2FFFF
| 356213 ||  || — || September 15, 2009 || Kitt Peak || Spacewatch || L4 || align=right | 7.4 km || 
|-id=214 bgcolor=#C2FFFF
| 356214 ||  || — || February 14, 2001 || Cima Ekar || ADAS || L4 || align=right | 11 km || 
|-id=215 bgcolor=#C2FFFF
| 356215 ||  || — || September 16, 2009 || Kitt Peak || Spacewatch || L4 || align=right | 8.2 km || 
|-id=216 bgcolor=#C2FFFF
| 356216 ||  || — || September 17, 2009 || Kitt Peak || Spacewatch || L4 || align=right | 7.7 km || 
|-id=217 bgcolor=#C2FFFF
| 356217 Clymene ||  ||  || September 23, 2009 || Zelenchukskaya || T. V. Kryachko || L4HEK || align=right | 11 km || 
|-id=218 bgcolor=#C2FFFF
| 356218 ||  || — || September 18, 2009 || Kitt Peak || Spacewatch || L4 || align=right | 6.5 km || 
|-id=219 bgcolor=#C2FFFF
| 356219 ||  || — || September 18, 2009 || Kitt Peak || Spacewatch || L4 || align=right | 7.1 km || 
|-id=220 bgcolor=#C2FFFF
| 356220 ||  || — || September 5, 2008 || Kitt Peak || Spacewatch || L4 || align=right | 8.7 km || 
|-id=221 bgcolor=#C2FFFF
| 356221 ||  || — || September 20, 2009 || Kitt Peak || Spacewatch || L4 || align=right | 7.8 km || 
|-id=222 bgcolor=#C2FFFF
| 356222 ||  || — || July 29, 2008 || Mount Lemmon || Mount Lemmon Survey || L4ERY || align=right | 8.0 km || 
|-id=223 bgcolor=#C2FFFF
| 356223 ||  || — || September 18, 2009 || Kitt Peak || Spacewatch || L4 || align=right | 9.5 km || 
|-id=224 bgcolor=#C2FFFF
| 356224 ||  || — || September 22, 2009 || Kitt Peak || Spacewatch || L4 || align=right | 7.3 km || 
|-id=225 bgcolor=#C2FFFF
| 356225 ||  || — || September 15, 2009 || Kitt Peak || Spacewatch || L4 || align=right | 7.7 km || 
|-id=226 bgcolor=#C2FFFF
| 356226 ||  || — || September 17, 2009 || Kitt Peak || Spacewatch || L4 || align=right | 9.4 km || 
|-id=227 bgcolor=#C2FFFF
| 356227 ||  || — || September 22, 2009 || Kitt Peak || Spacewatch || L4 || align=right | 7.3 km || 
|-id=228 bgcolor=#C2FFFF
| 356228 ||  || — || September 23, 2009 || Kitt Peak || Spacewatch || L4 || align=right | 7.9 km || 
|-id=229 bgcolor=#C2FFFF
| 356229 ||  || — || September 25, 2009 || Kitt Peak || Spacewatch || L4 || align=right | 6.7 km || 
|-id=230 bgcolor=#d6d6d6
| 356230 ||  || — || September 25, 2009 || Kitt Peak || Spacewatch || EUP || align=right | 3.7 km || 
|-id=231 bgcolor=#C2FFFF
| 356231 ||  || — || September 19, 2009 || Kitt Peak || Spacewatch || L4 || align=right | 9.2 km || 
|-id=232 bgcolor=#C2FFFF
| 356232 ||  || — || September 17, 2009 || Kitt Peak || Spacewatch || L4 || align=right | 8.9 km || 
|-id=233 bgcolor=#C2FFFF
| 356233 ||  || — || February 12, 2002 || Kitt Peak || Spacewatch || L4 || align=right | 12 km || 
|-id=234 bgcolor=#C2FFFF
| 356234 ||  || — || September 17, 2009 || Kitt Peak || Spacewatch || L4 || align=right | 7.0 km || 
|-id=235 bgcolor=#C2FFFF
| 356235 ||  || — || September 19, 2009 || Kitt Peak || Spacewatch || L4 || align=right | 6.7 km || 
|-id=236 bgcolor=#C2FFFF
| 356236 ||  || — || September 23, 2009 || Mount Lemmon || Mount Lemmon Survey || L4 || align=right | 9.8 km || 
|-id=237 bgcolor=#C2FFFF
| 356237 ||  || — || September 18, 2009 || Kitt Peak || Spacewatch || L4ARK || align=right | 9.1 km || 
|-id=238 bgcolor=#C2FFFF
| 356238 ||  || — || September 17, 2009 || Mount Lemmon || Mount Lemmon Survey || L4 || align=right | 10 km || 
|-id=239 bgcolor=#C2FFFF
| 356239 ||  || — || November 17, 1998 || Kitt Peak || Spacewatch || L4 || align=right | 7.2 km || 
|-id=240 bgcolor=#C2FFFF
| 356240 ||  || — || September 28, 2009 || Mount Lemmon || Mount Lemmon Survey || L4ERY || align=right | 8.8 km || 
|-id=241 bgcolor=#C2FFFF
| 356241 ||  || — || September 17, 2009 || Kitt Peak || Spacewatch || L4 || align=right | 10 km || 
|-id=242 bgcolor=#C2FFFF
| 356242 ||  || — || September 26, 2009 || Kitt Peak || Spacewatch || L4 || align=right | 7.2 km || 
|-id=243 bgcolor=#C2FFFF
| 356243 ||  || — || September 23, 2009 || Mount Lemmon || Mount Lemmon Survey || L4 || align=right | 8.9 km || 
|-id=244 bgcolor=#C2FFFF
| 356244 ||  || — || September 22, 2009 || Kitt Peak || Spacewatch || L4 || align=right | 8.1 km || 
|-id=245 bgcolor=#C2FFFF
| 356245 ||  || — || October 1, 2009 || Mount Lemmon || Mount Lemmon Survey || L4 || align=right | 12 km || 
|-id=246 bgcolor=#fefefe
| 356246 ||  || — || October 14, 2009 || Catalina || CSS || H || align=right data-sort-value="0.82" | 820 m || 
|-id=247 bgcolor=#C2FFFF
| 356247 ||  || — || October 16, 2009 || Mount Lemmon || Mount Lemmon Survey || L4 || align=right | 6.9 km || 
|-id=248 bgcolor=#C2FFFF
| 356248 ||  || — || August 17, 2009 || Kitt Peak || Spacewatch || L4ERY || align=right | 7.4 km || 
|-id=249 bgcolor=#C2FFFF
| 356249 ||  || — || September 15, 2009 || Kitt Peak || Spacewatch || L4 || align=right | 7.2 km || 
|-id=250 bgcolor=#C2FFFF
| 356250 ||  || — || April 5, 2003 || Kitt Peak || Spacewatch || L4 || align=right | 7.7 km || 
|-id=251 bgcolor=#C2FFFF
| 356251 ||  || — || September 22, 2009 || Kitt Peak || Spacewatch || L4 || align=right | 7.3 km || 
|-id=252 bgcolor=#C2FFFF
| 356252 ||  || — || October 23, 2009 || Mount Lemmon || Mount Lemmon Survey || L4 || align=right | 9.3 km || 
|-id=253 bgcolor=#C2FFFF
| 356253 ||  || — || October 21, 2009 || Mount Lemmon || Mount Lemmon Survey || L4 || align=right | 6.3 km || 
|-id=254 bgcolor=#C2FFFF
| 356254 ||  || — || November 15, 1998 || Kitt Peak || Spacewatch || L4 || align=right | 8.1 km || 
|-id=255 bgcolor=#C2FFFF
| 356255 ||  || — || September 22, 2009 || Kitt Peak || Spacewatch || L4 || align=right | 7.5 km || 
|-id=256 bgcolor=#fefefe
| 356256 ||  || — || September 20, 2009 || Catalina || CSS || H || align=right data-sort-value="0.77" | 770 m || 
|-id=257 bgcolor=#C2FFFF
| 356257 ||  || — || October 23, 2009 || Mount Lemmon || Mount Lemmon Survey || L4ERY || align=right | 11 km || 
|-id=258 bgcolor=#C2FFFF
| 356258 ||  || — || October 16, 2009 || Mount Lemmon || Mount Lemmon Survey || L4 || align=right | 7.0 km || 
|-id=259 bgcolor=#C2FFFF
| 356259 ||  || — || October 16, 2009 || Mount Lemmon || Mount Lemmon Survey || L4ERY || align=right | 11 km || 
|-id=260 bgcolor=#FA8072
| 356260 ||  || — || October 21, 2009 || Siding Spring || SSS || H || align=right | 1.0 km || 
|-id=261 bgcolor=#C2FFFF
| 356261 ||  || — || November 8, 2009 || Tzec Maun || Tzec Maun Obs. || L4 || align=right | 18 km || 
|-id=262 bgcolor=#C2FFFF
| 356262 ||  || — || September 12, 2007 || Mount Lemmon || Mount Lemmon Survey || L4 || align=right | 7.3 km || 
|-id=263 bgcolor=#C2FFFF
| 356263 ||  || — || October 25, 2009 || Kitt Peak || Spacewatch || L4 || align=right | 10 km || 
|-id=264 bgcolor=#C2FFFF
| 356264 ||  || — || October 2, 2009 || Mount Lemmon || Mount Lemmon Survey || L4 || align=right | 12 km || 
|-id=265 bgcolor=#C2FFFF
| 356265 ||  || — || November 8, 2009 || Kitt Peak || Spacewatch || L4ARK || align=right | 10 km || 
|-id=266 bgcolor=#C2FFFF
| 356266 ||  || — || November 9, 2009 || Kitt Peak || Spacewatch || L4 || align=right | 11 km || 
|-id=267 bgcolor=#FA8072
| 356267 ||  || — || November 15, 2009 || Socorro || LINEAR || H || align=right data-sort-value="0.81" | 810 m || 
|-id=268 bgcolor=#C2FFFF
| 356268 ||  || — || October 26, 2009 || Kitt Peak || Spacewatch || L4 || align=right | 9.5 km || 
|-id=269 bgcolor=#d6d6d6
| 356269 ||  || — || November 17, 2009 || Mount Lemmon || Mount Lemmon Survey || 3:2 || align=right | 5.3 km || 
|-id=270 bgcolor=#C2FFFF
| 356270 ||  || — || November 17, 2009 || Mount Lemmon || Mount Lemmon Survey || L4ERY || align=right | 8.8 km || 
|-id=271 bgcolor=#C2FFFF
| 356271 ||  || — || November 18, 2009 || Mount Lemmon || Mount Lemmon Survey || L4 || align=right | 8.1 km || 
|-id=272 bgcolor=#C2FFFF
| 356272 ||  || — || October 8, 2008 || Mount Lemmon || Mount Lemmon Survey || L4 || align=right | 7.2 km || 
|-id=273 bgcolor=#C2FFFF
| 356273 ||  || — || November 19, 2009 || Mount Lemmon || Mount Lemmon Survey || L4 || align=right | 8.9 km || 
|-id=274 bgcolor=#fefefe
| 356274 ||  || — || December 16, 2009 || Gnosca || S. Sposetti || H || align=right | 1.0 km || 
|-id=275 bgcolor=#C2FFFF
| 356275 ||  || — || January 8, 2010 || WISE || WISE || L4 || align=right | 14 km || 
|-id=276 bgcolor=#C2FFFF
| 356276 ||  || — || September 7, 2008 || Mount Lemmon || Mount Lemmon Survey || L4HEK || align=right | 9.9 km || 
|-id=277 bgcolor=#C2FFFF
| 356277 ||  || — || January 4, 2001 || Haleakala || NEAT || L4 || align=right | 11 km || 
|-id=278 bgcolor=#E9E9E9
| 356278 ||  || — || January 18, 2010 || WISE || WISE || — || align=right | 2.8 km || 
|-id=279 bgcolor=#C2FFFF
| 356279 ||  || — || August 23, 2007 || Kitt Peak || Spacewatch || L4 || align=right | 16 km || 
|-id=280 bgcolor=#C2FFFF
| 356280 ||  || — || August 31, 2007 || Siding Spring || K. Sárneczky, L. Kiss || L4 || align=right | 9.2 km || 
|-id=281 bgcolor=#fefefe
| 356281 ||  || — || February 14, 2010 || Kitt Peak || Spacewatch || — || align=right data-sort-value="0.93" | 930 m || 
|-id=282 bgcolor=#fefefe
| 356282 ||  || — || February 10, 2010 || Kitt Peak || Spacewatch || FLO || align=right data-sort-value="0.55" | 550 m || 
|-id=283 bgcolor=#fefefe
| 356283 ||  || — || February 3, 2006 || Mount Lemmon || Mount Lemmon Survey || — || align=right data-sort-value="0.65" | 650 m || 
|-id=284 bgcolor=#C2FFFF
| 356284 ||  || — || September 23, 2008 || Mount Lemmon || Mount Lemmon Survey || L4ERY || align=right | 12 km || 
|-id=285 bgcolor=#FFC2E0
| 356285 ||  || — || February 16, 2010 || Mount Lemmon || Mount Lemmon Survey || AMO +1km || align=right | 1.2 km || 
|-id=286 bgcolor=#E9E9E9
| 356286 ||  || — || February 20, 2010 || WISE || WISE || — || align=right | 2.9 km || 
|-id=287 bgcolor=#fefefe
| 356287 ||  || — || February 17, 2010 || Kitt Peak || Spacewatch || — || align=right data-sort-value="0.77" | 770 m || 
|-id=288 bgcolor=#fefefe
| 356288 ||  || — || February 17, 2010 || Kitt Peak || Spacewatch || — || align=right | 1.2 km || 
|-id=289 bgcolor=#fefefe
| 356289 ||  || — || March 12, 2010 || Mount Lemmon || Mount Lemmon Survey || FLO || align=right data-sort-value="0.69" | 690 m || 
|-id=290 bgcolor=#fefefe
| 356290 ||  || — || March 12, 2010 || Kitt Peak || Spacewatch || — || align=right data-sort-value="0.89" | 890 m || 
|-id=291 bgcolor=#E9E9E9
| 356291 ||  || — || March 14, 2010 || Kitt Peak || Spacewatch || EUN || align=right | 2.3 km || 
|-id=292 bgcolor=#fefefe
| 356292 ||  || — || March 15, 2010 || Kitt Peak || Spacewatch || — || align=right data-sort-value="0.94" | 940 m || 
|-id=293 bgcolor=#fefefe
| 356293 ||  || — || September 13, 2004 || Anderson Mesa || LONEOS || — || align=right | 1.1 km || 
|-id=294 bgcolor=#fefefe
| 356294 ||  || — || March 12, 2010 || Kitt Peak || Spacewatch || — || align=right data-sort-value="0.67" | 670 m || 
|-id=295 bgcolor=#fefefe
| 356295 ||  || — || March 13, 2010 || Kitt Peak || Spacewatch || — || align=right data-sort-value="0.83" | 830 m || 
|-id=296 bgcolor=#fefefe
| 356296 ||  || — || March 5, 1997 || Kitt Peak || Spacewatch || — || align=right data-sort-value="0.57" | 570 m || 
|-id=297 bgcolor=#fefefe
| 356297 ||  || — || September 6, 2004 || Siding Spring || SSS || FLO || align=right | 1.8 km || 
|-id=298 bgcolor=#fefefe
| 356298 ||  || — || March 22, 2010 || ESA OGS || ESA OGS || — || align=right | 1.4 km || 
|-id=299 bgcolor=#fefefe
| 356299 ||  || — || March 16, 2010 || Kitt Peak || Spacewatch || — || align=right data-sort-value="0.96" | 960 m || 
|-id=300 bgcolor=#fefefe
| 356300 ||  || — || April 5, 2010 || Kitt Peak || Spacewatch || V || align=right data-sort-value="0.85" | 850 m || 
|}

356301–356400 

|-bgcolor=#fefefe
| 356301 ||  || — || April 5, 2010 || Kitt Peak || Spacewatch || FLO || align=right data-sort-value="0.92" | 920 m || 
|-id=302 bgcolor=#fefefe
| 356302 ||  || — || April 6, 2010 || Kitt Peak || Spacewatch || V || align=right data-sort-value="0.70" | 700 m || 
|-id=303 bgcolor=#E9E9E9
| 356303 ||  || — || April 13, 2010 || WISE || WISE || MIT || align=right | 2.7 km || 
|-id=304 bgcolor=#fefefe
| 356304 ||  || — || March 26, 1995 || Kitt Peak || Spacewatch || — || align=right | 1.0 km || 
|-id=305 bgcolor=#fefefe
| 356305 ||  || — || April 9, 2010 || Kitt Peak || Spacewatch || — || align=right | 1.2 km || 
|-id=306 bgcolor=#fefefe
| 356306 ||  || — || February 3, 2006 || Anderson Mesa || LONEOS || V || align=right data-sort-value="0.86" | 860 m || 
|-id=307 bgcolor=#fefefe
| 356307 ||  || — || November 12, 2001 || Apache Point || SDSS || — || align=right data-sort-value="0.79" | 790 m || 
|-id=308 bgcolor=#fefefe
| 356308 ||  || — || March 26, 2003 || Kitt Peak || Spacewatch || NYS || align=right data-sort-value="0.50" | 500 m || 
|-id=309 bgcolor=#fefefe
| 356309 ||  || — || April 13, 2010 || Mount Lemmon || Mount Lemmon Survey || — || align=right data-sort-value="0.80" | 800 m || 
|-id=310 bgcolor=#fefefe
| 356310 ||  || — || April 7, 2010 || Kitt Peak || Spacewatch || FLO || align=right data-sort-value="0.59" | 590 m || 
|-id=311 bgcolor=#fefefe
| 356311 ||  || — || October 28, 2008 || Kitt Peak || Spacewatch || — || align=right data-sort-value="0.86" | 860 m || 
|-id=312 bgcolor=#d6d6d6
| 356312 ||  || — || April 25, 2010 || WISE || WISE || — || align=right | 3.5 km || 
|-id=313 bgcolor=#d6d6d6
| 356313 ||  || — || April 27, 2010 || WISE || WISE || Tj (2.98) || align=right | 4.3 km || 
|-id=314 bgcolor=#fefefe
| 356314 ||  || — || October 1, 2008 || Kitt Peak || Spacewatch || — || align=right data-sort-value="0.72" | 720 m || 
|-id=315 bgcolor=#E9E9E9
| 356315 ||  || — || April 26, 2010 || Mount Lemmon || Mount Lemmon Survey || — || align=right | 1.1 km || 
|-id=316 bgcolor=#fefefe
| 356316 ||  || — || January 23, 2006 || Kitt Peak || Spacewatch || MAS || align=right data-sort-value="0.73" | 730 m || 
|-id=317 bgcolor=#fefefe
| 356317 ||  || — || April 26, 2010 || Mount Lemmon || Mount Lemmon Survey || — || align=right data-sort-value="0.70" | 700 m || 
|-id=318 bgcolor=#fefefe
| 356318 ||  || — || April 20, 2010 || Siding Spring || SSS || — || align=right data-sort-value="0.88" | 880 m || 
|-id=319 bgcolor=#fefefe
| 356319 ||  || — || April 20, 2010 || Kitt Peak || Spacewatch || — || align=right data-sort-value="0.90" | 900 m || 
|-id=320 bgcolor=#d6d6d6
| 356320 ||  || — || May 1, 2010 || WISE || WISE || — || align=right | 3.7 km || 
|-id=321 bgcolor=#fefefe
| 356321 ||  || — || May 3, 2010 || Kitt Peak || Spacewatch || — || align=right | 1.5 km || 
|-id=322 bgcolor=#fefefe
| 356322 ||  || — || November 20, 2008 || Mount Lemmon || Mount Lemmon Survey || LCI || align=right | 1.0 km || 
|-id=323 bgcolor=#E9E9E9
| 356323 ||  || — || May 7, 2010 || Kitt Peak || Spacewatch || — || align=right | 1.1 km || 
|-id=324 bgcolor=#E9E9E9
| 356324 ||  || — || May 7, 2010 || WISE || WISE || DOR || align=right | 3.4 km || 
|-id=325 bgcolor=#d6d6d6
| 356325 ||  || — || April 24, 2009 || Kitt Peak || Spacewatch || — || align=right | 4.6 km || 
|-id=326 bgcolor=#fefefe
| 356326 ||  || — || January 23, 2006 || Kitt Peak || Spacewatch || — || align=right data-sort-value="0.71" | 710 m || 
|-id=327 bgcolor=#fefefe
| 356327 ||  || — || May 8, 2010 || Mount Lemmon || Mount Lemmon Survey || NYS || align=right data-sort-value="0.75" | 750 m || 
|-id=328 bgcolor=#fefefe
| 356328 ||  || — || May 3, 2010 || Kitt Peak || Spacewatch || — || align=right | 1.1 km || 
|-id=329 bgcolor=#fefefe
| 356329 ||  || — || January 23, 2006 || Kitt Peak || Spacewatch || NYS || align=right data-sort-value="0.69" | 690 m || 
|-id=330 bgcolor=#E9E9E9
| 356330 ||  || — || May 10, 2010 || WISE || WISE || — || align=right | 2.7 km || 
|-id=331 bgcolor=#d6d6d6
| 356331 ||  || — || May 11, 2010 || WISE || WISE || — || align=right | 4.5 km || 
|-id=332 bgcolor=#E9E9E9
| 356332 ||  || — || May 13, 2010 || WISE || WISE || ADE || align=right | 3.3 km || 
|-id=333 bgcolor=#E9E9E9
| 356333 ||  || — || May 11, 2010 || Kitt Peak || Spacewatch || — || align=right | 1.8 km || 
|-id=334 bgcolor=#fefefe
| 356334 ||  || — || December 7, 2005 || Kitt Peak || Spacewatch || FLO || align=right data-sort-value="0.59" | 590 m || 
|-id=335 bgcolor=#fefefe
| 356335 ||  || — || March 21, 1999 || Apache Point || SDSS || EUT || align=right data-sort-value="0.58" | 580 m || 
|-id=336 bgcolor=#fefefe
| 356336 ||  || — || May 17, 2010 || Kitt Peak || Spacewatch || — || align=right data-sort-value="0.82" | 820 m || 
|-id=337 bgcolor=#fefefe
| 356337 ||  || — || May 22, 2010 || Siding Spring || SSS || ERI || align=right | 2.2 km || 
|-id=338 bgcolor=#d6d6d6
| 356338 ||  || — || May 25, 2010 || WISE || WISE || EOS || align=right | 2.7 km || 
|-id=339 bgcolor=#E9E9E9
| 356339 ||  || — || May 28, 2010 || WISE || WISE || — || align=right | 4.1 km || 
|-id=340 bgcolor=#d6d6d6
| 356340 ||  || — || May 28, 2010 || WISE || WISE || EUP || align=right | 4.2 km || 
|-id=341 bgcolor=#E9E9E9
| 356341 ||  || — || May 30, 2010 || WISE || WISE || — || align=right | 2.4 km || 
|-id=342 bgcolor=#fefefe
| 356342 ||  || — || May 19, 2010 || Mount Lemmon || Mount Lemmon Survey || — || align=right | 1.0 km || 
|-id=343 bgcolor=#fefefe
| 356343 ||  || — || December 14, 2001 || Socorro || LINEAR || PHO || align=right | 1.4 km || 
|-id=344 bgcolor=#d6d6d6
| 356344 ||  || — || May 31, 2010 || WISE || WISE || — || align=right | 4.2 km || 
|-id=345 bgcolor=#d6d6d6
| 356345 ||  || — || June 1, 2010 || WISE || WISE || — || align=right | 4.7 km || 
|-id=346 bgcolor=#E9E9E9
| 356346 ||  || — || June 1, 2010 || WISE || WISE || — || align=right | 3.0 km || 
|-id=347 bgcolor=#d6d6d6
| 356347 ||  || — || October 23, 2005 || Catalina || CSS || — || align=right | 5.5 km || 
|-id=348 bgcolor=#fefefe
| 356348 ||  || — || June 3, 2010 || Kitt Peak || Spacewatch || V || align=right data-sort-value="0.75" | 750 m || 
|-id=349 bgcolor=#d6d6d6
| 356349 ||  || — || June 9, 2010 || WISE || WISE || — || align=right | 4.1 km || 
|-id=350 bgcolor=#fefefe
| 356350 ||  || — || June 5, 2010 || Kitt Peak || Spacewatch || V || align=right data-sort-value="0.67" | 670 m || 
|-id=351 bgcolor=#fefefe
| 356351 ||  || — || April 3, 2006 || Catalina || CSS || — || align=right | 1.0 km || 
|-id=352 bgcolor=#d6d6d6
| 356352 ||  || — || June 9, 2010 || WISE || WISE || ALA || align=right | 4.8 km || 
|-id=353 bgcolor=#d6d6d6
| 356353 ||  || — || June 12, 2010 || WISE || WISE || — || align=right | 3.5 km || 
|-id=354 bgcolor=#d6d6d6
| 356354 ||  || — || June 12, 2010 || WISE || WISE || VER || align=right | 4.6 km || 
|-id=355 bgcolor=#d6d6d6
| 356355 ||  || — || June 13, 2010 || WISE || WISE || — || align=right | 4.2 km || 
|-id=356 bgcolor=#d6d6d6
| 356356 ||  || — || June 13, 2010 || WISE || WISE || HYG || align=right | 4.3 km || 
|-id=357 bgcolor=#d6d6d6
| 356357 ||  || — || June 13, 2010 || WISE || WISE || HYG || align=right | 2.8 km || 
|-id=358 bgcolor=#d6d6d6
| 356358 ||  || — || June 14, 2010 || WISE || WISE || EOS || align=right | 4.3 km || 
|-id=359 bgcolor=#d6d6d6
| 356359 ||  || — || June 14, 2010 || WISE || WISE || — || align=right | 5.0 km || 
|-id=360 bgcolor=#d6d6d6
| 356360 ||  || — || June 15, 2010 || WISE || WISE || — || align=right | 2.8 km || 
|-id=361 bgcolor=#d6d6d6
| 356361 ||  || — || June 16, 2004 || Kitt Peak || Spacewatch || — || align=right | 3.8 km || 
|-id=362 bgcolor=#d6d6d6
| 356362 ||  || — || March 24, 2003 || Kitt Peak || Spacewatch || — || align=right | 4.6 km || 
|-id=363 bgcolor=#d6d6d6
| 356363 ||  || — || June 17, 2010 || WISE || WISE || URS || align=right | 5.0 km || 
|-id=364 bgcolor=#d6d6d6
| 356364 ||  || — || June 24, 2010 || WISE || WISE || LUT || align=right | 5.4 km || 
|-id=365 bgcolor=#d6d6d6
| 356365 ||  || — || June 24, 2010 || WISE || WISE || VER || align=right | 3.6 km || 
|-id=366 bgcolor=#E9E9E9
| 356366 ||  || — || June 25, 2010 || WISE || WISE || ADE || align=right | 3.0 km || 
|-id=367 bgcolor=#d6d6d6
| 356367 ||  || — || June 26, 2010 || WISE || WISE || — || align=right | 4.4 km || 
|-id=368 bgcolor=#d6d6d6
| 356368 ||  || — || June 27, 2010 || WISE || WISE || — || align=right | 4.7 km || 
|-id=369 bgcolor=#d6d6d6
| 356369 ||  || — || June 27, 2010 || WISE || WISE || — || align=right | 4.3 km || 
|-id=370 bgcolor=#d6d6d6
| 356370 ||  || — || September 10, 2004 || Kitt Peak || Spacewatch || 7:4 || align=right | 5.4 km || 
|-id=371 bgcolor=#d6d6d6
| 356371 ||  || — || March 24, 2003 || Kitt Peak || Spacewatch || — || align=right | 3.9 km || 
|-id=372 bgcolor=#fefefe
| 356372 ||  || — || July 5, 2010 || Kitt Peak || Spacewatch || — || align=right data-sort-value="0.97" | 970 m || 
|-id=373 bgcolor=#fefefe
| 356373 ||  || — || July 6, 2010 || Mount Lemmon || Mount Lemmon Survey || — || align=right | 1.0 km || 
|-id=374 bgcolor=#d6d6d6
| 356374 ||  || — || July 4, 2010 || Kitt Peak || Spacewatch || — || align=right | 3.8 km || 
|-id=375 bgcolor=#d6d6d6
| 356375 ||  || — || July 7, 2010 || WISE || WISE || — || align=right | 4.1 km || 
|-id=376 bgcolor=#d6d6d6
| 356376 ||  || — || July 15, 2010 || WISE || WISE || — || align=right | 5.5 km || 
|-id=377 bgcolor=#d6d6d6
| 356377 ||  || — || August 28, 2005 || Goodricke-Pigott || R. A. Tucker || — || align=right | 3.5 km || 
|-id=378 bgcolor=#d6d6d6
| 356378 ||  || — || July 13, 2010 || WISE || WISE || — || align=right | 2.8 km || 
|-id=379 bgcolor=#E9E9E9
| 356379 ||  || — || July 16, 2010 || WISE || WISE || — || align=right | 2.5 km || 
|-id=380 bgcolor=#d6d6d6
| 356380 ||  || — || June 17, 2004 || Siding Spring || SSS || — || align=right | 2.4 km || 
|-id=381 bgcolor=#d6d6d6
| 356381 ||  || — || September 15, 1993 || Kitt Peak || Spacewatch || — || align=right | 4.9 km || 
|-id=382 bgcolor=#d6d6d6
| 356382 ||  || — || January 27, 2007 || Kitt Peak || Spacewatch || 7:4 || align=right | 4.2 km || 
|-id=383 bgcolor=#d6d6d6
| 356383 ||  || — || February 21, 2001 || Apache Point || SDSS || — || align=right | 4.4 km || 
|-id=384 bgcolor=#d6d6d6
| 356384 ||  || — || August 21, 2004 || Siding Spring || SSS || EUP || align=right | 5.1 km || 
|-id=385 bgcolor=#d6d6d6
| 356385 ||  || — || October 11, 2004 || Kitt Peak || Spacewatch || — || align=right | 4.5 km || 
|-id=386 bgcolor=#d6d6d6
| 356386 ||  || — || June 24, 2004 || Mauna Kea || K. J. Meech || — || align=right | 3.0 km || 
|-id=387 bgcolor=#fefefe
| 356387 ||  || — || July 20, 2010 || Modra || Modra Obs. || — || align=right data-sort-value="0.89" | 890 m || 
|-id=388 bgcolor=#d6d6d6
| 356388 ||  || — || July 25, 2003 || Wise || D. Polishook || SYL7:4 || align=right | 4.9 km || 
|-id=389 bgcolor=#d6d6d6
| 356389 ||  || — || October 4, 2004 || Kitt Peak || Spacewatch || MEL || align=right | 5.3 km || 
|-id=390 bgcolor=#E9E9E9
| 356390 ||  || — || September 14, 2006 || Kitt Peak || Spacewatch || — || align=right | 2.6 km || 
|-id=391 bgcolor=#E9E9E9
| 356391 ||  || — || August 19, 2006 || Palomar || NEAT || — || align=right | 1.4 km || 
|-id=392 bgcolor=#d6d6d6
| 356392 ||  || — || February 28, 2008 || Kitt Peak || Spacewatch || EOS || align=right | 2.1 km || 
|-id=393 bgcolor=#d6d6d6
| 356393 ||  || — || December 13, 2006 || Kitt Peak || Spacewatch || — || align=right | 3.7 km || 
|-id=394 bgcolor=#FFC2E0
| 356394 ||  || — || August 21, 2010 || WISE || WISE || APO +1kmcritical || align=right | 1.2 km || 
|-id=395 bgcolor=#E9E9E9
| 356395 ||  || — || July 31, 2001 || Palomar || NEAT || — || align=right | 2.5 km || 
|-id=396 bgcolor=#d6d6d6
| 356396 ||  || — || October 6, 1999 || Socorro || LINEAR || EOS || align=right | 2.4 km || 
|-id=397 bgcolor=#d6d6d6
| 356397 ||  || — || September 1, 2010 || Mount Lemmon || Mount Lemmon Survey || — || align=right | 4.0 km || 
|-id=398 bgcolor=#d6d6d6
| 356398 ||  || — || January 22, 2002 || Kitt Peak || Spacewatch || — || align=right | 3.7 km || 
|-id=399 bgcolor=#E9E9E9
| 356399 ||  || — || August 16, 2001 || Socorro || LINEAR || — || align=right | 1.8 km || 
|-id=400 bgcolor=#d6d6d6
| 356400 ||  || — || September 26, 2005 || Kitt Peak || Spacewatch || — || align=right | 2.6 km || 
|}

356401–356500 

|-bgcolor=#d6d6d6
| 356401 ||  || — || October 6, 2005 || Kitt Peak || Spacewatch || — || align=right | 2.9 km || 
|-id=402 bgcolor=#d6d6d6
| 356402 ||  || — || February 10, 2008 || Kitt Peak || Spacewatch || EMA || align=right | 4.3 km || 
|-id=403 bgcolor=#E9E9E9
| 356403 ||  || — || October 2, 2006 || Mount Lemmon || Mount Lemmon Survey || — || align=right | 2.4 km || 
|-id=404 bgcolor=#d6d6d6
| 356404 ||  || — || February 1, 2003 || Kitt Peak || Spacewatch || — || align=right | 2.6 km || 
|-id=405 bgcolor=#d6d6d6
| 356405 ||  || — || September 13, 2004 || Anderson Mesa || LONEOS || — || align=right | 3.4 km || 
|-id=406 bgcolor=#E9E9E9
| 356406 ||  || — || March 31, 2004 || Kitt Peak || Spacewatch || — || align=right | 2.4 km || 
|-id=407 bgcolor=#d6d6d6
| 356407 ||  || — || October 10, 2005 || Kitt Peak || Spacewatch || — || align=right | 3.0 km || 
|-id=408 bgcolor=#d6d6d6
| 356408 ||  || — || September 30, 2010 || Catalina || CSS || — || align=right | 3.4 km || 
|-id=409 bgcolor=#d6d6d6
| 356409 ||  || — || April 7, 2008 || Mount Lemmon || Mount Lemmon Survey || — || align=right | 3.7 km || 
|-id=410 bgcolor=#d6d6d6
| 356410 ||  || — || January 26, 2006 || Mount Lemmon || Mount Lemmon Survey || 7:4 || align=right | 3.3 km || 
|-id=411 bgcolor=#d6d6d6
| 356411 ||  || — || March 5, 2008 || Kitt Peak || Spacewatch || — || align=right | 2.7 km || 
|-id=412 bgcolor=#d6d6d6
| 356412 ||  || — || July 22, 2004 || Mauna Kea || C. Veillet || — || align=right | 3.1 km || 
|-id=413 bgcolor=#d6d6d6
| 356413 ||  || — || April 7, 2003 || Kitt Peak || Spacewatch || — || align=right | 2.7 km || 
|-id=414 bgcolor=#E9E9E9
| 356414 ||  || — || January 10, 2008 || Mount Lemmon || Mount Lemmon Survey || — || align=right | 2.4 km || 
|-id=415 bgcolor=#d6d6d6
| 356415 ||  || — || September 7, 2004 || Kitt Peak || Spacewatch || — || align=right | 2.7 km || 
|-id=416 bgcolor=#d6d6d6
| 356416 ||  || — || February 12, 2008 || Mount Lemmon || Mount Lemmon Survey || — || align=right | 3.8 km || 
|-id=417 bgcolor=#C2FFFF
| 356417 ||  || — || September 26, 2009 || Kitt Peak || Spacewatch || L4 || align=right | 8.2 km || 
|-id=418 bgcolor=#C2FFFF
| 356418 ||  || — || September 17, 2009 || Kitt Peak || Spacewatch || L4 || align=right | 8.2 km || 
|-id=419 bgcolor=#C2FFFF
| 356419 ||  || — || October 30, 2010 || Kitt Peak || Spacewatch || L4 || align=right | 12 km || 
|-id=420 bgcolor=#E9E9E9
| 356420 ||  || — || January 23, 2004 || Socorro || LINEAR || — || align=right | 2.7 km || 
|-id=421 bgcolor=#C2FFFF
| 356421 ||  || — || May 10, 2005 || Cerro Tololo || M. W. Buie || L4 || align=right | 13 km || 
|-id=422 bgcolor=#C2FFFF
| 356422 ||  || — || November 15, 1998 || Kitt Peak || Spacewatch || L4 || align=right | 8.1 km || 
|-id=423 bgcolor=#C2FFFF
| 356423 ||  || — || September 15, 2009 || Kitt Peak || Spacewatch || L4 || align=right | 8.2 km || 
|-id=424 bgcolor=#C2FFFF
| 356424 ||  || — || September 25, 2009 || Kitt Peak || Spacewatch || L4 || align=right | 8.2 km || 
|-id=425 bgcolor=#C2FFFF
| 356425 ||  || — || August 22, 2007 || Kitt Peak || Spacewatch || L4 || align=right | 8.1 km || 
|-id=426 bgcolor=#C2FFFF
| 356426 ||  || — || February 13, 2002 || Apache Point || SDSS || L4ERY || align=right | 6.9 km || 
|-id=427 bgcolor=#C2FFFF
| 356427 ||  || — || October 11, 2010 || Mount Lemmon || Mount Lemmon Survey || L4 || align=right | 8.8 km || 
|-id=428 bgcolor=#C2FFFF
| 356428 ||  || — || November 7, 2010 || Socorro || LINEAR || L4 || align=right | 11 km || 
|-id=429 bgcolor=#C2FFFF
| 356429 ||  || — || February 16, 2001 || Kitt Peak || Spacewatch || L4 || align=right | 9.8 km || 
|-id=430 bgcolor=#C2FFFF
| 356430 ||  || — || September 16, 2009 || Kitt Peak || Spacewatch || L4 || align=right | 9.0 km || 
|-id=431 bgcolor=#C2FFFF
| 356431 ||  || — || October 16, 2009 || Mount Lemmon || Mount Lemmon Survey || L4 || align=right | 8.6 km || 
|-id=432 bgcolor=#C2FFFF
| 356432 ||  || — || January 13, 2000 || Kitt Peak || Spacewatch || L4ARK || align=right | 8.7 km || 
|-id=433 bgcolor=#C2FFFF
| 356433 ||  || — || October 11, 2010 || Mount Lemmon || Mount Lemmon Survey || L4 || align=right | 8.7 km || 
|-id=434 bgcolor=#d6d6d6
| 356434 ||  || — || October 30, 1999 || Kitt Peak || Spacewatch || — || align=right | 4.2 km || 
|-id=435 bgcolor=#C2FFFF
| 356435 ||  || — || September 15, 2009 || Kitt Peak || Spacewatch || L4 || align=right | 6.5 km || 
|-id=436 bgcolor=#C2FFFF
| 356436 ||  || — || April 4, 2003 || Kitt Peak || Spacewatch || L4 || align=right | 8.6 km || 
|-id=437 bgcolor=#C2FFFF
| 356437 ||  || — || July 29, 2008 || Kitt Peak || Spacewatch || L4 || align=right | 7.3 km || 
|-id=438 bgcolor=#C2FFFF
| 356438 ||  || — || September 21, 2008 || Mount Lemmon || Mount Lemmon Survey || L4 || align=right | 8.1 km || 
|-id=439 bgcolor=#C2FFFF
| 356439 ||  || — || September 5, 2008 || Kitt Peak || Spacewatch || L4 || align=right | 8.6 km || 
|-id=440 bgcolor=#C2FFFF
| 356440 ||  || — || October 27, 2009 || Mount Lemmon || Mount Lemmon Survey || L4 || align=right | 8.9 km || 
|-id=441 bgcolor=#C2FFFF
| 356441 ||  || — || September 17, 2009 || Kitt Peak || Spacewatch || L4 || align=right | 8.3 km || 
|-id=442 bgcolor=#C2FFFF
| 356442 ||  || — || November 30, 2000 || Apache Point || SDSS || L4 || align=right | 11 km || 
|-id=443 bgcolor=#C2FFFF
| 356443 ||  || — || October 29, 2010 || Mount Lemmon || Mount Lemmon Survey || L4 || align=right | 8.6 km || 
|-id=444 bgcolor=#C2FFFF
| 356444 ||  || — || October 28, 2010 || Mount Lemmon || Mount Lemmon Survey || L4 || align=right | 10 km || 
|-id=445 bgcolor=#C2FFFF
| 356445 ||  || — || June 6, 2005 || Kitt Peak || Spacewatch || L4 || align=right | 12 km || 
|-id=446 bgcolor=#C2FFFF
| 356446 ||  || — || June 17, 2005 || Mount Lemmon || Mount Lemmon Survey || L4 || align=right | 13 km || 
|-id=447 bgcolor=#C2FFFF
| 356447 ||  || — || November 2, 2010 || Kitt Peak || Spacewatch || L4 || align=right | 8.8 km || 
|-id=448 bgcolor=#C2FFFF
| 356448 ||  || — || September 10, 2007 || Kitt Peak || Spacewatch || L4 || align=right | 8.9 km || 
|-id=449 bgcolor=#C2FFFF
| 356449 ||  || — || November 8, 2010 || Mount Lemmon || Mount Lemmon Survey || L4ERY || align=right | 8.6 km || 
|-id=450 bgcolor=#C2FFFF
| 356450 ||  || — || June 11, 2007 || Mauna Kea || D. D. Balam || L4 || align=right | 12 km || 
|-id=451 bgcolor=#C2FFFF
| 356451 ||  || — || July 19, 2007 || Mount Lemmon || Mount Lemmon Survey || L4 || align=right | 9.8 km || 
|-id=452 bgcolor=#d6d6d6
| 356452 ||  || — || August 22, 2006 || Palomar || NEAT || BRA || align=right | 1.5 km || 
|-id=453 bgcolor=#FA8072
| 356453 ||  || — || December 27, 2005 || Kitt Peak || Spacewatch || — || align=right | 1.1 km || 
|-id=454 bgcolor=#fefefe
| 356454 ||  || — || November 12, 2001 || Socorro || LINEAR || — || align=right data-sort-value="0.95" | 950 m || 
|-id=455 bgcolor=#fefefe
| 356455 ||  || — || June 3, 2011 || Mount Lemmon || Mount Lemmon Survey || NYS || align=right data-sort-value="0.72" | 720 m || 
|-id=456 bgcolor=#d6d6d6
| 356456 ||  || — || February 8, 2002 || Palomar || NEAT || EUP || align=right | 3.3 km || 
|-id=457 bgcolor=#E9E9E9
| 356457 ||  || — || December 14, 2003 || Kitt Peak || Spacewatch || — || align=right | 1.6 km || 
|-id=458 bgcolor=#fefefe
| 356458 ||  || — || March 5, 2002 || Kitt Peak || Spacewatch || V || align=right data-sort-value="0.94" | 940 m || 
|-id=459 bgcolor=#E9E9E9
| 356459 ||  || — || September 13, 2007 || Mount Lemmon || Mount Lemmon Survey || EUN || align=right data-sort-value="0.96" | 960 m || 
|-id=460 bgcolor=#fefefe
| 356460 ||  || — || June 19, 2007 || Kitt Peak || Spacewatch || — || align=right data-sort-value="0.92" | 920 m || 
|-id=461 bgcolor=#fefefe
| 356461 ||  || — || October 24, 2008 || Catalina || CSS || — || align=right data-sort-value="0.87" | 870 m || 
|-id=462 bgcolor=#fefefe
| 356462 ||  || — || March 5, 2006 || Kitt Peak || Spacewatch || V || align=right data-sort-value="0.57" | 570 m || 
|-id=463 bgcolor=#fefefe
| 356463 ||  || — || August 6, 2007 || Lulin Observatory || Lulin Obs. || — || align=right | 1.1 km || 
|-id=464 bgcolor=#E9E9E9
| 356464 ||  || — || October 19, 2007 || Mount Lemmon || Mount Lemmon Survey || — || align=right | 1.7 km || 
|-id=465 bgcolor=#E9E9E9
| 356465 ||  || — || January 1, 2008 || Mount Lemmon || Mount Lemmon Survey || — || align=right | 3.3 km || 
|-id=466 bgcolor=#fefefe
| 356466 ||  || — || October 22, 2008 || Kitt Peak || Spacewatch || — || align=right data-sort-value="0.82" | 820 m || 
|-id=467 bgcolor=#fefefe
| 356467 ||  || — || December 30, 2008 || Mount Lemmon || Mount Lemmon Survey || — || align=right | 1.1 km || 
|-id=468 bgcolor=#E9E9E9
| 356468 ||  || — || July 3, 2011 || Mount Lemmon || Mount Lemmon Survey || — || align=right | 2.2 km || 
|-id=469 bgcolor=#fefefe
| 356469 ||  || — || February 18, 2010 || Mount Lemmon || Mount Lemmon Survey || — || align=right data-sort-value="0.98" | 980 m || 
|-id=470 bgcolor=#d6d6d6
| 356470 ||  || — || January 13, 2008 || Vail-Jarnac || Jarnac Obs. || — || align=right | 3.0 km || 
|-id=471 bgcolor=#fefefe
| 356471 ||  || — || December 4, 2008 || Mount Lemmon || Mount Lemmon Survey || NYS || align=right data-sort-value="0.79" | 790 m || 
|-id=472 bgcolor=#fefefe
| 356472 ||  || — || November 3, 2004 || Kitt Peak || Spacewatch || — || align=right | 2.3 km || 
|-id=473 bgcolor=#fefefe
| 356473 ||  || — || January 23, 2006 || Mount Lemmon || Mount Lemmon Survey || — || align=right data-sort-value="0.94" | 940 m || 
|-id=474 bgcolor=#fefefe
| 356474 ||  || — || February 18, 2010 || Mount Lemmon || Mount Lemmon Survey || — || align=right | 1.2 km || 
|-id=475 bgcolor=#E9E9E9
| 356475 ||  || — || August 23, 2007 || Kitt Peak || Spacewatch || — || align=right data-sort-value="0.85" | 850 m || 
|-id=476 bgcolor=#fefefe
| 356476 ||  || — || January 2, 2009 || Mount Lemmon || Mount Lemmon Survey || — || align=right data-sort-value="0.81" | 810 m || 
|-id=477 bgcolor=#fefefe
| 356477 ||  || — || June 11, 2011 || Mount Lemmon || Mount Lemmon Survey || — || align=right | 1.3 km || 
|-id=478 bgcolor=#fefefe
| 356478 ||  || — || February 13, 2010 || Mount Lemmon || Mount Lemmon Survey || — || align=right data-sort-value="0.83" | 830 m || 
|-id=479 bgcolor=#fefefe
| 356479 ||  || — || February 8, 2002 || Kitt Peak || Spacewatch || — || align=right data-sort-value="0.74" | 740 m || 
|-id=480 bgcolor=#fefefe
| 356480 ||  || — || April 2, 2006 || Kitt Peak || Spacewatch || — || align=right data-sort-value="0.87" | 870 m || 
|-id=481 bgcolor=#E9E9E9
| 356481 ||  || — || February 9, 2005 || Kitt Peak || Spacewatch || — || align=right | 3.9 km || 
|-id=482 bgcolor=#E9E9E9
| 356482 ||  || — || September 10, 2007 || Mount Lemmon || Mount Lemmon Survey || NEM || align=right | 2.2 km || 
|-id=483 bgcolor=#d6d6d6
| 356483 ||  || — || October 16, 2006 || Catalina || CSS || — || align=right | 2.9 km || 
|-id=484 bgcolor=#fefefe
| 356484 ||  || — || June 22, 2007 || Mount Lemmon || Mount Lemmon Survey || — || align=right | 1.1 km || 
|-id=485 bgcolor=#fefefe
| 356485 ||  || — || April 19, 2006 || Mount Lemmon || Mount Lemmon Survey || V || align=right data-sort-value="0.77" | 770 m || 
|-id=486 bgcolor=#d6d6d6
| 356486 ||  || — || September 21, 2000 || Kitt Peak || Spacewatch || — || align=right | 2.9 km || 
|-id=487 bgcolor=#fefefe
| 356487 ||  || — || November 25, 2005 || Kitt Peak || Spacewatch || — || align=right data-sort-value="0.89" | 890 m || 
|-id=488 bgcolor=#fefefe
| 356488 ||  || — || March 11, 2002 || Palomar || NEAT || V || align=right data-sort-value="0.91" | 910 m || 
|-id=489 bgcolor=#fefefe
| 356489 ||  || — || June 2, 2003 || Kitt Peak || Spacewatch || — || align=right | 1.3 km || 
|-id=490 bgcolor=#E9E9E9
| 356490 ||  || — || September 10, 2002 || Palomar || NEAT || — || align=right | 2.5 km || 
|-id=491 bgcolor=#fefefe
| 356491 ||  || — || May 2, 2006 || Mount Lemmon || Mount Lemmon Survey || — || align=right data-sort-value="0.91" | 910 m || 
|-id=492 bgcolor=#fefefe
| 356492 ||  || — || March 23, 2006 || Kitt Peak || Spacewatch || — || align=right data-sort-value="0.91" | 910 m || 
|-id=493 bgcolor=#E9E9E9
| 356493 ||  || — || December 13, 2007 || Socorro || LINEAR || — || align=right | 2.3 km || 
|-id=494 bgcolor=#fefefe
| 356494 ||  || — || October 1, 2000 || Socorro || LINEAR || — || align=right data-sort-value="0.86" | 860 m || 
|-id=495 bgcolor=#d6d6d6
| 356495 ||  || — || July 3, 2005 || Mount Lemmon || Mount Lemmon Survey || LIX || align=right | 3.1 km || 
|-id=496 bgcolor=#E9E9E9
| 356496 ||  || — || July 18, 2006 || Siding Spring || SSS || — || align=right | 2.8 km || 
|-id=497 bgcolor=#fefefe
| 356497 ||  || — || March 13, 2007 || Mount Lemmon || Mount Lemmon Survey || — || align=right | 1.0 km || 
|-id=498 bgcolor=#fefefe
| 356498 ||  || — || October 25, 2008 || Socorro || LINEAR || FLO || align=right data-sort-value="0.67" | 670 m || 
|-id=499 bgcolor=#E9E9E9
| 356499 ||  || — || October 4, 1997 || Kitt Peak || Spacewatch || — || align=right | 3.4 km || 
|-id=500 bgcolor=#d6d6d6
| 356500 ||  || — || December 18, 2001 || Anderson Mesa || LONEOS || — || align=right | 3.1 km || 
|}

356501–356600 

|-bgcolor=#fefefe
| 356501 ||  || — || February 25, 2006 || Kitt Peak || Spacewatch || — || align=right data-sort-value="0.91" | 910 m || 
|-id=502 bgcolor=#E9E9E9
| 356502 ||  || — || April 12, 2005 || Mount Lemmon || Mount Lemmon Survey || HEN || align=right | 1.2 km || 
|-id=503 bgcolor=#d6d6d6
| 356503 ||  || — || October 18, 2006 || Kitt Peak || Spacewatch || — || align=right | 2.5 km || 
|-id=504 bgcolor=#E9E9E9
| 356504 ||  || — || September 11, 2007 || Mount Lemmon || Mount Lemmon Survey || — || align=right | 1.2 km || 
|-id=505 bgcolor=#d6d6d6
| 356505 ||  || — || November 19, 2006 || Kitt Peak || Spacewatch || — || align=right | 2.5 km || 
|-id=506 bgcolor=#E9E9E9
| 356506 ||  || — || March 16, 2005 || Kitt Peak || Spacewatch || — || align=right data-sort-value="0.76" | 760 m || 
|-id=507 bgcolor=#fefefe
| 356507 ||  || — || September 29, 2008 || Mount Lemmon || Mount Lemmon Survey || — || align=right data-sort-value="0.72" | 720 m || 
|-id=508 bgcolor=#E9E9E9
| 356508 ||  || — || February 17, 2004 || Socorro || LINEAR || INO || align=right | 1.2 km || 
|-id=509 bgcolor=#E9E9E9
| 356509 ||  || — || February 20, 2009 || Kitt Peak || Spacewatch || — || align=right | 2.4 km || 
|-id=510 bgcolor=#E9E9E9
| 356510 ||  || — || January 13, 2008 || Kitt Peak || Spacewatch || — || align=right | 2.0 km || 
|-id=511 bgcolor=#fefefe
| 356511 ||  || — || September 11, 2007 || Mount Lemmon || Mount Lemmon Survey || V || align=right data-sort-value="0.56" | 560 m || 
|-id=512 bgcolor=#fefefe
| 356512 ||  || — || July 7, 2007 || Reedy Creek || J. Broughton || — || align=right | 1.2 km || 
|-id=513 bgcolor=#E9E9E9
| 356513 ||  || — || July 3, 2011 || Mount Lemmon || Mount Lemmon Survey || AEO || align=right | 1.2 km || 
|-id=514 bgcolor=#E9E9E9
| 356514 ||  || — || November 17, 2007 || Kitt Peak || Spacewatch || AGN || align=right | 1.2 km || 
|-id=515 bgcolor=#fefefe
| 356515 ||  || — || February 2, 2006 || Kitt Peak || Spacewatch || V || align=right data-sort-value="0.74" | 740 m || 
|-id=516 bgcolor=#E9E9E9
| 356516 ||  || — || October 20, 2007 || Kitt Peak || Spacewatch || — || align=right | 1.2 km || 
|-id=517 bgcolor=#E9E9E9
| 356517 ||  || — || April 6, 2005 || Kitt Peak || Spacewatch || — || align=right | 1.9 km || 
|-id=518 bgcolor=#E9E9E9
| 356518 ||  || — || April 11, 2005 || Mount Lemmon || Mount Lemmon Survey || WIT || align=right | 1.00 km || 
|-id=519 bgcolor=#fefefe
| 356519 ||  || — || October 3, 2000 || Socorro || LINEAR || — || align=right data-sort-value="0.88" | 880 m || 
|-id=520 bgcolor=#FA8072
| 356520 ||  || — || August 26, 1998 || Anderson Mesa || LONEOS || — || align=right data-sort-value="0.83" | 830 m || 
|-id=521 bgcolor=#E9E9E9
| 356521 ||  || — || March 17, 2005 || Mount Lemmon || Mount Lemmon Survey || WIT || align=right | 1.1 km || 
|-id=522 bgcolor=#fefefe
| 356522 ||  || — || March 20, 1999 || Apache Point || SDSS || V || align=right data-sort-value="0.63" | 630 m || 
|-id=523 bgcolor=#E9E9E9
| 356523 ||  || — || February 27, 2009 || Kitt Peak || Spacewatch || AGN || align=right | 1.6 km || 
|-id=524 bgcolor=#E9E9E9
| 356524 ||  || — || December 17, 2007 || Kitt Peak || Spacewatch || HOF || align=right | 2.8 km || 
|-id=525 bgcolor=#E9E9E9
| 356525 ||  || — || November 2, 2007 || Kitt Peak || Spacewatch || — || align=right | 1.3 km || 
|-id=526 bgcolor=#fefefe
| 356526 ||  || — || October 7, 1977 || Palomar || PLS || V || align=right data-sort-value="0.95" | 950 m || 
|-id=527 bgcolor=#E9E9E9
| 356527 ||  || — || January 29, 2009 || Mount Lemmon || Mount Lemmon Survey || JUN || align=right | 3.4 km || 
|-id=528 bgcolor=#d6d6d6
| 356528 ||  || — || November 10, 2006 || Kitt Peak || Spacewatch || — || align=right | 3.3 km || 
|-id=529 bgcolor=#d6d6d6
| 356529 ||  || — || October 25, 2000 || Socorro || LINEAR || — || align=right | 3.9 km || 
|-id=530 bgcolor=#E9E9E9
| 356530 ||  || — || October 8, 2007 || Catalina || CSS || — || align=right | 1.4 km || 
|-id=531 bgcolor=#fefefe
| 356531 ||  || — || July 21, 2007 || Lulin || Lulin Obs. || — || align=right | 1.0 km || 
|-id=532 bgcolor=#fefefe
| 356532 ||  || — || February 28, 2006 || Mount Lemmon || Mount Lemmon Survey || — || align=right | 1.0 km || 
|-id=533 bgcolor=#E9E9E9
| 356533 ||  || — || November 19, 2003 || Kitt Peak || Spacewatch || — || align=right | 1.0 km || 
|-id=534 bgcolor=#fefefe
| 356534 ||  || — || September 22, 2004 || Kitt Peak || Spacewatch || — || align=right | 2.1 km || 
|-id=535 bgcolor=#E9E9E9
| 356535 ||  || — || April 5, 2000 || Kitt Peak || Spacewatch || AGN || align=right | 1.3 km || 
|-id=536 bgcolor=#E9E9E9
| 356536 ||  || — || December 29, 2008 || Mount Lemmon || Mount Lemmon Survey || — || align=right | 1.4 km || 
|-id=537 bgcolor=#E9E9E9
| 356537 ||  || — || October 30, 2007 || Kitt Peak || Spacewatch || — || align=right | 1.5 km || 
|-id=538 bgcolor=#d6d6d6
| 356538 ||  || — || March 10, 2008 || Kitt Peak || Spacewatch || — || align=right | 2.3 km || 
|-id=539 bgcolor=#d6d6d6
| 356539 ||  || — || December 5, 2007 || Kitt Peak || Spacewatch || KOR || align=right | 1.1 km || 
|-id=540 bgcolor=#E9E9E9
| 356540 ||  || — || October 4, 2002 || Socorro || LINEAR || NEM || align=right | 2.1 km || 
|-id=541 bgcolor=#E9E9E9
| 356541 ||  || — || March 31, 2009 || Kitt Peak || Spacewatch || NEM || align=right | 2.3 km || 
|-id=542 bgcolor=#fefefe
| 356542 ||  || — || September 20, 2001 || Socorro || LINEAR || — || align=right | 1.00 km || 
|-id=543 bgcolor=#E9E9E9
| 356543 ||  || — || October 16, 1998 || Kitt Peak || Spacewatch || — || align=right | 1.9 km || 
|-id=544 bgcolor=#fefefe
| 356544 ||  || — || October 13, 2004 || Kitt Peak || Spacewatch || ERI || align=right | 2.2 km || 
|-id=545 bgcolor=#d6d6d6
| 356545 ||  || — || November 2, 2006 || Mount Lemmon || Mount Lemmon Survey || — || align=right | 2.8 km || 
|-id=546 bgcolor=#E9E9E9
| 356546 ||  || — || November 2, 2007 || Kitt Peak || Spacewatch || — || align=right | 1.3 km || 
|-id=547 bgcolor=#E9E9E9
| 356547 ||  || — || August 17, 2006 || Palomar || NEAT || MRX || align=right | 1.2 km || 
|-id=548 bgcolor=#fefefe
| 356548 ||  || — || October 5, 2004 || Kitt Peak || Spacewatch || — || align=right data-sort-value="0.88" | 880 m || 
|-id=549 bgcolor=#E9E9E9
| 356549 ||  || — || September 13, 2002 || Palomar || NEAT || — || align=right | 1.7 km || 
|-id=550 bgcolor=#fefefe
| 356550 ||  || — || March 12, 2010 || Kitt Peak || Spacewatch || — || align=right data-sort-value="0.94" | 940 m || 
|-id=551 bgcolor=#E9E9E9
| 356551 ||  || — || August 29, 2006 || Kitt Peak || Spacewatch || HOF || align=right | 2.2 km || 
|-id=552 bgcolor=#fefefe
| 356552 ||  || — || February 7, 2002 || Palomar || NEAT || — || align=right | 1.0 km || 
|-id=553 bgcolor=#E9E9E9
| 356553 ||  || — || October 2, 1997 || Kitt Peak || Spacewatch || — || align=right | 2.5 km || 
|-id=554 bgcolor=#E9E9E9
| 356554 ||  || — || October 12, 2007 || Mount Lemmon || Mount Lemmon Survey || — || align=right data-sort-value="0.98" | 980 m || 
|-id=555 bgcolor=#E9E9E9
| 356555 ||  || — || February 20, 2009 || Kitt Peak || Spacewatch || — || align=right | 2.5 km || 
|-id=556 bgcolor=#E9E9E9
| 356556 ||  || — || September 15, 2007 || Mount Lemmon || Mount Lemmon Survey || — || align=right | 1.5 km || 
|-id=557 bgcolor=#d6d6d6
| 356557 ||  || — || August 5, 2005 || Palomar || NEAT || — || align=right | 3.9 km || 
|-id=558 bgcolor=#fefefe
| 356558 ||  || — || February 24, 2006 || Kitt Peak || Spacewatch || V || align=right data-sort-value="0.67" | 670 m || 
|-id=559 bgcolor=#E9E9E9
| 356559 ||  || — || December 15, 2007 || Kitt Peak || Spacewatch || — || align=right | 2.2 km || 
|-id=560 bgcolor=#fefefe
| 356560 ||  || — || August 24, 2000 || Socorro || LINEAR || NYS || align=right data-sort-value="0.74" | 740 m || 
|-id=561 bgcolor=#fefefe
| 356561 ||  || — || April 14, 2002 || Kitt Peak || Spacewatch || V || align=right data-sort-value="0.82" | 820 m || 
|-id=562 bgcolor=#fefefe
| 356562 ||  || — || April 2, 2006 || Catalina || CSS || — || align=right | 1.1 km || 
|-id=563 bgcolor=#E9E9E9
| 356563 ||  || — || September 29, 2003 || Anderson Mesa || LONEOS || — || align=right | 1.4 km || 
|-id=564 bgcolor=#E9E9E9
| 356564 ||  || — || August 10, 2007 || Kitt Peak || Spacewatch || — || align=right data-sort-value="0.83" | 830 m || 
|-id=565 bgcolor=#fefefe
| 356565 ||  || — || September 23, 2000 || Socorro || LINEAR || FLO || align=right data-sort-value="0.81" | 810 m || 
|-id=566 bgcolor=#E9E9E9
| 356566 ||  || — || October 8, 2007 || Catalina || CSS || — || align=right | 1.3 km || 
|-id=567 bgcolor=#E9E9E9
| 356567 ||  || — || April 17, 2001 || Anderson Mesa || LONEOS || EUN || align=right | 1.7 km || 
|-id=568 bgcolor=#fefefe
| 356568 ||  || — || October 10, 2007 || Mount Lemmon || Mount Lemmon Survey || V || align=right data-sort-value="0.85" | 850 m || 
|-id=569 bgcolor=#E9E9E9
| 356569 ||  || — || November 20, 2007 || Catalina || CSS || EUN || align=right | 1.4 km || 
|-id=570 bgcolor=#E9E9E9
| 356570 ||  || — || March 22, 1996 || Kitt Peak || Spacewatch || — || align=right | 1.7 km || 
|-id=571 bgcolor=#E9E9E9
| 356571 ||  || — || October 11, 2002 || Kitt Peak || Spacewatch || — || align=right | 2.6 km || 
|-id=572 bgcolor=#E9E9E9
| 356572 ||  || — || January 25, 2009 || Kitt Peak || Spacewatch || — || align=right | 1.9 km || 
|-id=573 bgcolor=#E9E9E9
| 356573 ||  || — || November 15, 2007 || Anderson Mesa || LONEOS || — || align=right | 3.5 km || 
|-id=574 bgcolor=#E9E9E9
| 356574 ||  || — || December 17, 2003 || Kitt Peak || Spacewatch || — || align=right | 1.2 km || 
|-id=575 bgcolor=#d6d6d6
| 356575 ||  || — || August 7, 2005 || Siding Spring || SSS || — || align=right | 3.5 km || 
|-id=576 bgcolor=#d6d6d6
| 356576 ||  || — || August 31, 2005 || Kitt Peak || Spacewatch || — || align=right | 3.4 km || 
|-id=577 bgcolor=#E9E9E9
| 356577 ||  || — || November 7, 2007 || Kitt Peak || Spacewatch || — || align=right | 2.6 km || 
|-id=578 bgcolor=#E9E9E9
| 356578 ||  || — || February 20, 2009 || Kitt Peak || Spacewatch || — || align=right | 1.5 km || 
|-id=579 bgcolor=#fefefe
| 356579 ||  || — || October 2, 2000 || Anderson Mesa || LONEOS || V || align=right data-sort-value="0.87" | 870 m || 
|-id=580 bgcolor=#E9E9E9
| 356580 ||  || — || April 10, 2005 || Kitt Peak || Spacewatch || — || align=right | 2.0 km || 
|-id=581 bgcolor=#E9E9E9
| 356581 ||  || — || November 23, 2003 || Anderson Mesa || LONEOS || — || align=right | 1.9 km || 
|-id=582 bgcolor=#E9E9E9
| 356582 ||  || — || October 21, 2003 || Kitt Peak || Spacewatch || — || align=right | 1.2 km || 
|-id=583 bgcolor=#d6d6d6
| 356583 ||  || — || October 2, 2006 || Mount Lemmon || Mount Lemmon Survey || KOR || align=right | 1.3 km || 
|-id=584 bgcolor=#fefefe
| 356584 ||  || — || October 13, 1999 || Apache Point || SDSS || — || align=right | 1.2 km || 
|-id=585 bgcolor=#d6d6d6
| 356585 ||  || — || October 16, 2006 || Mount Lemmon || Mount Lemmon Survey || — || align=right | 2.7 km || 
|-id=586 bgcolor=#d6d6d6
| 356586 ||  || — || September 28, 2006 || Kitt Peak || Spacewatch || K-2 || align=right | 1.5 km || 
|-id=587 bgcolor=#E9E9E9
| 356587 ||  || — || December 16, 2007 || Mount Lemmon || Mount Lemmon Survey || — || align=right | 2.4 km || 
|-id=588 bgcolor=#d6d6d6
| 356588 ||  || — || April 1, 2003 || Apache Point || SDSS || EOS || align=right | 1.9 km || 
|-id=589 bgcolor=#E9E9E9
| 356589 ||  || — || September 24, 2006 || Anderson Mesa || LONEOS || — || align=right | 3.4 km || 
|-id=590 bgcolor=#fefefe
| 356590 ||  || — || January 31, 2006 || Kitt Peak || Spacewatch || V || align=right data-sort-value="0.67" | 670 m || 
|-id=591 bgcolor=#E9E9E9
| 356591 ||  || — || May 8, 1997 || Kitt Peak || Spacewatch || EUN || align=right | 1.5 km || 
|-id=592 bgcolor=#d6d6d6
| 356592 ||  || — || August 27, 2005 || Palomar || NEAT || HYG || align=right | 3.3 km || 
|-id=593 bgcolor=#d6d6d6
| 356593 ||  || — || October 18, 1995 || Kitt Peak || Spacewatch || — || align=right | 2.1 km || 
|-id=594 bgcolor=#E9E9E9
| 356594 ||  || — || January 19, 2004 || Kitt Peak || Spacewatch || — || align=right | 1.8 km || 
|-id=595 bgcolor=#d6d6d6
| 356595 ||  || — || September 30, 2005 || Anderson Mesa || LONEOS || EUP || align=right | 6.4 km || 
|-id=596 bgcolor=#E9E9E9
| 356596 ||  || — || January 30, 2009 || Mount Lemmon || Mount Lemmon Survey || — || align=right | 1.2 km || 
|-id=597 bgcolor=#fefefe
| 356597 ||  || — || September 10, 2007 || Kitt Peak || Spacewatch || — || align=right data-sort-value="0.92" | 920 m || 
|-id=598 bgcolor=#E9E9E9
| 356598 ||  || — || August 19, 2006 || Kitt Peak || Spacewatch || WIT || align=right | 1.1 km || 
|-id=599 bgcolor=#E9E9E9
| 356599 ||  || — || January 19, 2004 || Kitt Peak || Spacewatch || — || align=right | 1.9 km || 
|-id=600 bgcolor=#E9E9E9
| 356600 ||  || — || August 27, 2006 || Kitt Peak || Spacewatch || HOF || align=right | 2.6 km || 
|}

356601–356700 

|-bgcolor=#d6d6d6
| 356601 ||  || — || August 27, 2005 || Palomar || NEAT || — || align=right | 3.3 km || 
|-id=602 bgcolor=#fefefe
| 356602 ||  || — || August 24, 2007 || Kitt Peak || Spacewatch || — || align=right data-sort-value="0.94" | 940 m || 
|-id=603 bgcolor=#E9E9E9
| 356603 ||  || — || April 25, 2000 || Kitt Peak || Spacewatch || MRX || align=right | 1.2 km || 
|-id=604 bgcolor=#d6d6d6
| 356604 ||  || — || February 7, 2008 || Mount Lemmon || Mount Lemmon Survey || — || align=right | 2.4 km || 
|-id=605 bgcolor=#fefefe
| 356605 ||  || — || September 24, 2000 || Socorro || LINEAR || — || align=right | 1.1 km || 
|-id=606 bgcolor=#d6d6d6
| 356606 ||  || — || August 6, 2005 || Palomar || NEAT || — || align=right | 3.4 km || 
|-id=607 bgcolor=#E9E9E9
| 356607 ||  || — || March 12, 2004 || Palomar || NEAT || MRX || align=right | 1.3 km || 
|-id=608 bgcolor=#d6d6d6
| 356608 ||  || — || January 12, 2008 || Kitt Peak || Spacewatch || — || align=right | 2.8 km || 
|-id=609 bgcolor=#E9E9E9
| 356609 ||  || — || December 16, 2007 || Mount Lemmon || Mount Lemmon Survey || — || align=right | 1.6 km || 
|-id=610 bgcolor=#d6d6d6
| 356610 ||  || — || April 10, 2010 || WISE || WISE || — || align=right | 4.6 km || 
|-id=611 bgcolor=#fefefe
| 356611 ||  || — || October 30, 2008 || Kitt Peak || Spacewatch || — || align=right data-sort-value="0.78" | 780 m || 
|-id=612 bgcolor=#fefefe
| 356612 ||  || — || April 9, 2003 || Palomar || NEAT || FLO || align=right data-sort-value="0.75" | 750 m || 
|-id=613 bgcolor=#E9E9E9
| 356613 ||  || — || November 2, 2007 || Mount Lemmon || Mount Lemmon Survey || HEN || align=right | 1.1 km || 
|-id=614 bgcolor=#E9E9E9
| 356614 ||  || — || March 20, 1999 || Caussols || ODAS || AGN || align=right | 1.6 km || 
|-id=615 bgcolor=#E9E9E9
| 356615 ||  || — || August 29, 2006 || Kitt Peak || Spacewatch || HEN || align=right | 1.4 km || 
|-id=616 bgcolor=#fefefe
| 356616 ||  || — || December 29, 2008 || Mount Lemmon || Mount Lemmon Survey || V || align=right data-sort-value="0.79" | 790 m || 
|-id=617 bgcolor=#E9E9E9
| 356617 ||  || — || August 6, 2002 || Palomar || NEAT || — || align=right | 1.5 km || 
|-id=618 bgcolor=#fefefe
| 356618 ||  || — || September 23, 1997 || Kitt Peak || Spacewatch || — || align=right data-sort-value="0.99" | 990 m || 
|-id=619 bgcolor=#d6d6d6
| 356619 ||  || — || October 21, 2006 || Mount Lemmon || Mount Lemmon Survey || — || align=right | 3.1 km || 
|-id=620 bgcolor=#d6d6d6
| 356620 ||  || — || August 30, 2005 || Kitt Peak || Spacewatch || — || align=right | 2.6 km || 
|-id=621 bgcolor=#fefefe
| 356621 ||  || — || October 21, 2003 || Kitt Peak || Spacewatch || — || align=right | 1.8 km || 
|-id=622 bgcolor=#E9E9E9
| 356622 ||  || — || February 11, 2004 || Palomar || NEAT || — || align=right | 2.0 km || 
|-id=623 bgcolor=#E9E9E9
| 356623 ||  || — || July 6, 2002 || Kitt Peak || Spacewatch || — || align=right | 1.7 km || 
|-id=624 bgcolor=#d6d6d6
| 356624 ||  || — || September 27, 2006 || Mount Lemmon || Mount Lemmon Survey || — || align=right | 2.7 km || 
|-id=625 bgcolor=#E9E9E9
| 356625 ||  || — || March 10, 2005 || Mount Lemmon || Mount Lemmon Survey || MAR || align=right | 1.3 km || 
|-id=626 bgcolor=#E9E9E9
| 356626 ||  || — || April 2, 2009 || Mount Lemmon || Mount Lemmon Survey || — || align=right | 2.7 km || 
|-id=627 bgcolor=#E9E9E9
| 356627 ||  || — || September 27, 2006 || Kitt Peak || Spacewatch || — || align=right | 2.7 km || 
|-id=628 bgcolor=#E9E9E9
| 356628 ||  || — || September 25, 2006 || Kitt Peak || Spacewatch || — || align=right | 2.3 km || 
|-id=629 bgcolor=#d6d6d6
| 356629 ||  || — || February 28, 2008 || Mount Lemmon || Mount Lemmon Survey || — || align=right | 3.2 km || 
|-id=630 bgcolor=#d6d6d6
| 356630 ||  || — || September 23, 2006 || San Marcello || Pistoia Mountains Obs. || — || align=right | 2.7 km || 
|-id=631 bgcolor=#d6d6d6
| 356631 ||  || — || September 24, 2006 || Kitt Peak || Spacewatch || — || align=right | 2.0 km || 
|-id=632 bgcolor=#d6d6d6
| 356632 ||  || — || October 20, 2006 || Kitt Peak || Spacewatch || KOR || align=right | 1.4 km || 
|-id=633 bgcolor=#d6d6d6
| 356633 ||  || — || July 9, 2005 || Kitt Peak || Spacewatch || — || align=right | 2.5 km || 
|-id=634 bgcolor=#d6d6d6
| 356634 ||  || — || February 7, 2008 || Mount Lemmon || Mount Lemmon Survey || — || align=right | 3.3 km || 
|-id=635 bgcolor=#E9E9E9
| 356635 ||  || — || July 25, 2006 || Mount Lemmon || Mount Lemmon Survey || HEN || align=right | 1.2 km || 
|-id=636 bgcolor=#fefefe
| 356636 ||  || — || October 11, 2004 || Kitt Peak || Spacewatch || — || align=right data-sort-value="0.86" | 860 m || 
|-id=637 bgcolor=#d6d6d6
| 356637 ||  || — || June 29, 2005 || Kitt Peak || Spacewatch || — || align=right | 2.2 km || 
|-id=638 bgcolor=#E9E9E9
| 356638 ||  || — || November 20, 2003 || Socorro || LINEAR || — || align=right | 1.3 km || 
|-id=639 bgcolor=#fefefe
| 356639 ||  || — || January 22, 2006 || Mount Lemmon || Mount Lemmon Survey || NYS || align=right data-sort-value="0.82" | 820 m || 
|-id=640 bgcolor=#E9E9E9
| 356640 ||  || — || November 29, 1997 || Kitt Peak || Spacewatch || — || align=right | 3.0 km || 
|-id=641 bgcolor=#fefefe
| 356641 ||  || — || July 6, 2003 || Kitt Peak || Spacewatch || — || align=right | 1.2 km || 
|-id=642 bgcolor=#E9E9E9
| 356642 ||  || — || March 15, 2004 || Kitt Peak || Spacewatch || AGN || align=right | 1.1 km || 
|-id=643 bgcolor=#E9E9E9
| 356643 ||  || — || August 21, 2006 || Kitt Peak || Spacewatch || WIT || align=right | 1.2 km || 
|-id=644 bgcolor=#E9E9E9
| 356644 ||  || — || April 2, 2005 || Kitt Peak || Spacewatch || — || align=right | 1.6 km || 
|-id=645 bgcolor=#d6d6d6
| 356645 ||  || — || July 30, 2005 || Palomar || NEAT || — || align=right | 2.8 km || 
|-id=646 bgcolor=#d6d6d6
| 356646 ||  || — || June 7, 2010 || WISE || WISE || — || align=right | 5.4 km || 
|-id=647 bgcolor=#E9E9E9
| 356647 ||  || — || November 6, 2007 || Kitt Peak || Spacewatch || — || align=right | 1.2 km || 
|-id=648 bgcolor=#E9E9E9
| 356648 ||  || — || August 18, 2006 || Kitt Peak || Spacewatch || — || align=right | 2.2 km || 
|-id=649 bgcolor=#d6d6d6
| 356649 ||  || — || December 9, 2006 || Kitt Peak || Spacewatch || — || align=right | 3.1 km || 
|-id=650 bgcolor=#d6d6d6
| 356650 ||  || — || July 15, 2004 || Siding Spring || SSS || — || align=right | 4.4 km || 
|-id=651 bgcolor=#d6d6d6
| 356651 ||  || — || June 2, 2010 || WISE || WISE || 7:4 || align=right | 3.3 km || 
|-id=652 bgcolor=#d6d6d6
| 356652 ||  || — || October 31, 2006 || Mount Lemmon || Mount Lemmon Survey || KOR || align=right | 1.4 km || 
|-id=653 bgcolor=#E9E9E9
| 356653 ||  || — || April 20, 2006 || Kitt Peak || Spacewatch || — || align=right | 1.8 km || 
|-id=654 bgcolor=#d6d6d6
| 356654 ||  || — || September 28, 2006 || Mount Lemmon || Mount Lemmon Survey || — || align=right | 3.0 km || 
|-id=655 bgcolor=#fefefe
| 356655 ||  || — || March 26, 1996 || Kitt Peak || Spacewatch || — || align=right | 1.0 km || 
|-id=656 bgcolor=#E9E9E9
| 356656 ||  || — || September 14, 2006 || Palomar || NEAT || AGN || align=right | 1.3 km || 
|-id=657 bgcolor=#d6d6d6
| 356657 ||  || — || November 24, 2006 || Mount Lemmon || Mount Lemmon Survey || — || align=right | 2.9 km || 
|-id=658 bgcolor=#E9E9E9
| 356658 ||  || — || October 4, 2002 || Socorro || LINEAR || GEF || align=right | 1.2 km || 
|-id=659 bgcolor=#E9E9E9
| 356659 ||  || — || November 11, 2007 || Mount Lemmon || Mount Lemmon Survey || — || align=right | 2.2 km || 
|-id=660 bgcolor=#E9E9E9
| 356660 ||  || — || March 18, 2009 || Kitt Peak || Spacewatch || WIT || align=right | 1.2 km || 
|-id=661 bgcolor=#d6d6d6
| 356661 ||  || — || October 20, 2006 || Palomar || NEAT || — || align=right | 2.4 km || 
|-id=662 bgcolor=#d6d6d6
| 356662 ||  || — || September 24, 2005 || Kitt Peak || Spacewatch || VER || align=right | 2.6 km || 
|-id=663 bgcolor=#fefefe
| 356663 ||  || — || September 18, 2003 || Kitt Peak || Spacewatch || SUL || align=right | 2.1 km || 
|-id=664 bgcolor=#E9E9E9
| 356664 ||  || — || August 27, 2006 || Kitt Peak || Spacewatch || — || align=right | 2.0 km || 
|-id=665 bgcolor=#fefefe
| 356665 ||  || — || August 23, 2007 || Kitt Peak || Spacewatch || — || align=right data-sort-value="0.86" | 860 m || 
|-id=666 bgcolor=#d6d6d6
| 356666 ||  || — || August 30, 2005 || Kitt Peak || Spacewatch || — || align=right | 2.6 km || 
|-id=667 bgcolor=#d6d6d6
| 356667 ||  || — || September 26, 2006 || Kitt Peak || Spacewatch || 628 || align=right | 1.9 km || 
|-id=668 bgcolor=#E9E9E9
| 356668 ||  || — || October 22, 2006 || Mount Lemmon || Mount Lemmon Survey || — || align=right | 2.5 km || 
|-id=669 bgcolor=#E9E9E9
| 356669 ||  || — || September 14, 2006 || Kitt Peak || Spacewatch || AST || align=right | 1.9 km || 
|-id=670 bgcolor=#d6d6d6
| 356670 ||  || — || October 1, 2005 || Kitt Peak || Spacewatch || — || align=right | 3.2 km || 
|-id=671 bgcolor=#E9E9E9
| 356671 ||  || — || May 19, 2010 || WISE || WISE || GEF || align=right | 3.8 km || 
|-id=672 bgcolor=#E9E9E9
| 356672 ||  || — || September 17, 2006 || Kitt Peak || Spacewatch || — || align=right | 2.2 km || 
|-id=673 bgcolor=#d6d6d6
| 356673 ||  || — || December 13, 2006 || Kitt Peak || Spacewatch || — || align=right | 2.9 km || 
|-id=674 bgcolor=#E9E9E9
| 356674 ||  || — || February 3, 2008 || Catalina || CSS || — || align=right | 2.7 km || 
|-id=675 bgcolor=#d6d6d6
| 356675 ||  || — || October 1, 2005 || Kitt Peak || Spacewatch || — || align=right | 2.7 km || 
|-id=676 bgcolor=#d6d6d6
| 356676 ||  || — || January 16, 2008 || Kitt Peak || Spacewatch || — || align=right | 2.8 km || 
|-id=677 bgcolor=#fefefe
| 356677 ||  || — || April 4, 2002 || Palomar || NEAT || — || align=right data-sort-value="0.96" | 960 m || 
|-id=678 bgcolor=#E9E9E9
| 356678 ||  || — || March 13, 2005 || Kitt Peak || Spacewatch || — || align=right | 1.4 km || 
|-id=679 bgcolor=#E9E9E9
| 356679 ||  || — || August 30, 1998 || Kitt Peak || Spacewatch || — || align=right | 1.4 km || 
|-id=680 bgcolor=#d6d6d6
| 356680 ||  || — || November 23, 2006 || Kitt Peak || Spacewatch || — || align=right | 2.3 km || 
|-id=681 bgcolor=#E9E9E9
| 356681 ||  || — || March 21, 2004 || Kitt Peak || Spacewatch || — || align=right | 2.5 km || 
|-id=682 bgcolor=#d6d6d6
| 356682 ||  || — || November 17, 2006 || Mount Lemmon || Mount Lemmon Survey || — || align=right | 3.7 km || 
|-id=683 bgcolor=#E9E9E9
| 356683 ||  || — || August 28, 2006 || Kitt Peak || Spacewatch || HOF || align=right | 2.8 km || 
|-id=684 bgcolor=#d6d6d6
| 356684 ||  || — || June 5, 2005 || Kitt Peak || Spacewatch || — || align=right | 2.9 km || 
|-id=685 bgcolor=#E9E9E9
| 356685 ||  || — || October 23, 2011 || Desert Moon || B. L. Stevens || — || align=right | 3.4 km || 
|-id=686 bgcolor=#E9E9E9
| 356686 ||  || — || April 15, 2005 || Kitt Peak || Spacewatch || — || align=right | 1.4 km || 
|-id=687 bgcolor=#d6d6d6
| 356687 ||  || — || February 9, 2008 || Mount Lemmon || Mount Lemmon Survey || HYG || align=right | 2.8 km || 
|-id=688 bgcolor=#E9E9E9
| 356688 ||  || — || January 22, 2004 || Socorro || LINEAR || — || align=right | 3.0 km || 
|-id=689 bgcolor=#d6d6d6
| 356689 ||  || — || April 19, 2004 || Kitt Peak || Spacewatch || 628 || align=right | 1.8 km || 
|-id=690 bgcolor=#E9E9E9
| 356690 ||  || — || February 24, 2009 || Kitt Peak || Spacewatch || — || align=right | 2.0 km || 
|-id=691 bgcolor=#d6d6d6
| 356691 ||  || — || October 3, 2011 || XuYi || PMO NEO || — || align=right | 3.2 km || 
|-id=692 bgcolor=#E9E9E9
| 356692 ||  || — || October 21, 1993 || Kitt Peak || Spacewatch || — || align=right | 2.1 km || 
|-id=693 bgcolor=#d6d6d6
| 356693 ||  || — || November 28, 2000 || Kitt Peak || Spacewatch || — || align=right | 3.5 km || 
|-id=694 bgcolor=#E9E9E9
| 356694 ||  || — || September 18, 2006 || Catalina || CSS || — || align=right | 2.8 km || 
|-id=695 bgcolor=#E9E9E9
| 356695 ||  || — || February 12, 2000 || Apache Point || SDSS || — || align=right | 1.9 km || 
|-id=696 bgcolor=#d6d6d6
| 356696 ||  || — || November 12, 2006 || Mount Lemmon || Mount Lemmon Survey || — || align=right | 2.5 km || 
|-id=697 bgcolor=#d6d6d6
| 356697 ||  || — || September 1, 2005 || Kitt Peak || Spacewatch || — || align=right | 2.9 km || 
|-id=698 bgcolor=#d6d6d6
| 356698 ||  || — || September 24, 2005 || Kitt Peak || Spacewatch || — || align=right | 2.7 km || 
|-id=699 bgcolor=#E9E9E9
| 356699 ||  || — || August 29, 2006 || Catalina || CSS || — || align=right | 2.3 km || 
|-id=700 bgcolor=#d6d6d6
| 356700 ||  || — || November 18, 2006 || Kitt Peak || Spacewatch || — || align=right | 2.6 km || 
|}

356701–356800 

|-bgcolor=#E9E9E9
| 356701 ||  || — || August 15, 2002 || Kitt Peak || Spacewatch || — || align=right | 1.4 km || 
|-id=702 bgcolor=#d6d6d6
| 356702 ||  || — || November 1, 2000 || Socorro || LINEAR || TIR || align=right | 3.9 km || 
|-id=703 bgcolor=#E9E9E9
| 356703 ||  || — || December 4, 2007 || Mount Lemmon || Mount Lemmon Survey || HOF || align=right | 2.8 km || 
|-id=704 bgcolor=#E9E9E9
| 356704 ||  || — || November 22, 1998 || Kitt Peak || Spacewatch || — || align=right | 1.8 km || 
|-id=705 bgcolor=#d6d6d6
| 356705 ||  || — || April 19, 2009 || Kitt Peak || Spacewatch || EOS || align=right | 2.1 km || 
|-id=706 bgcolor=#d6d6d6
| 356706 ||  || — || January 19, 2008 || Mount Lemmon || Mount Lemmon Survey || EMA || align=right | 3.3 km || 
|-id=707 bgcolor=#d6d6d6
| 356707 ||  || — || June 27, 2005 || Kitt Peak || Spacewatch || — || align=right | 2.7 km || 
|-id=708 bgcolor=#fefefe
| 356708 ||  || — || March 26, 2006 || Kitt Peak || Spacewatch || — || align=right | 1.2 km || 
|-id=709 bgcolor=#fefefe
| 356709 ||  || — || March 22, 2006 || Catalina || CSS || — || align=right | 1.1 km || 
|-id=710 bgcolor=#d6d6d6
| 356710 ||  || — || September 16, 2010 || Mount Lemmon || Mount Lemmon Survey || EOS || align=right | 2.8 km || 
|-id=711 bgcolor=#d6d6d6
| 356711 ||  || — || September 25, 2000 || Anderson Mesa || LONEOS || — || align=right | 3.1 km || 
|-id=712 bgcolor=#d6d6d6
| 356712 ||  || — || November 29, 2000 || Socorro || LINEAR || EUP || align=right | 5.1 km || 
|-id=713 bgcolor=#fefefe
| 356713 ||  || — || April 10, 2003 || Kitt Peak || Spacewatch || — || align=right | 1.4 km || 
|-id=714 bgcolor=#d6d6d6
| 356714 ||  || — || July 4, 2005 || Palomar || NEAT || — || align=right | 3.6 km || 
|-id=715 bgcolor=#d6d6d6
| 356715 ||  || — || August 28, 2005 || Kitt Peak || Spacewatch || HYG || align=right | 2.6 km || 
|-id=716 bgcolor=#d6d6d6
| 356716 ||  || — || April 1, 2003 || Apache Point || SDSS || EOS || align=right | 2.4 km || 
|-id=717 bgcolor=#E9E9E9
| 356717 ||  || — || February 20, 2009 || Kitt Peak || Spacewatch || WIT || align=right | 1.3 km || 
|-id=718 bgcolor=#d6d6d6
| 356718 ||  || — || April 10, 2003 || Kitt Peak || Spacewatch || EOS || align=right | 2.5 km || 
|-id=719 bgcolor=#fefefe
| 356719 ||  || — || January 7, 2006 || Mount Lemmon || Mount Lemmon Survey || — || align=right data-sort-value="0.97" | 970 m || 
|-id=720 bgcolor=#E9E9E9
| 356720 ||  || — || September 12, 2002 || Palomar || NEAT || — || align=right | 1.7 km || 
|-id=721 bgcolor=#E9E9E9
| 356721 ||  || — || March 12, 2005 || Kitt Peak || Spacewatch || — || align=right | 1.1 km || 
|-id=722 bgcolor=#E9E9E9
| 356722 ||  || — || December 5, 2002 || Kitt Peak || Spacewatch || — || align=right | 2.8 km || 
|-id=723 bgcolor=#d6d6d6
| 356723 ||  || — || August 28, 2005 || Kitt Peak || Spacewatch || — || align=right | 2.7 km || 
|-id=724 bgcolor=#d6d6d6
| 356724 ||  || — || September 23, 2005 || Kitt Peak || Spacewatch || — || align=right | 3.2 km || 
|-id=725 bgcolor=#d6d6d6
| 356725 ||  || — || December 13, 2006 || Kitt Peak || Spacewatch || — || align=right | 2.3 km || 
|-id=726 bgcolor=#E9E9E9
| 356726 ||  || — || November 1, 2007 || Kitt Peak || Spacewatch || — || align=right | 1.1 km || 
|-id=727 bgcolor=#E9E9E9
| 356727 ||  || — || March 11, 2005 || Kitt Peak || Spacewatch || — || align=right | 1.3 km || 
|-id=728 bgcolor=#d6d6d6
| 356728 ||  || — || February 10, 2002 || Socorro || LINEAR || HYG || align=right | 3.0 km || 
|-id=729 bgcolor=#E9E9E9
| 356729 ||  || — || October 3, 2002 || Palomar || NEAT || — || align=right | 2.6 km || 
|-id=730 bgcolor=#d6d6d6
| 356730 ||  || — || July 26, 2005 || Palomar || NEAT || — || align=right | 3.4 km || 
|-id=731 bgcolor=#fefefe
| 356731 ||  || — || January 19, 2001 || Socorro || LINEAR || NYS || align=right data-sort-value="0.91" | 910 m || 
|-id=732 bgcolor=#d6d6d6
| 356732 ||  || — || August 26, 2005 || Palomar || NEAT || — || align=right | 3.3 km || 
|-id=733 bgcolor=#d6d6d6
| 356733 ||  || — || July 1, 2005 || Kitt Peak || Spacewatch || — || align=right | 2.4 km || 
|-id=734 bgcolor=#d6d6d6
| 356734 ||  || — || March 25, 2003 || Kitt Peak || Spacewatch || EOS || align=right | 2.3 km || 
|-id=735 bgcolor=#E9E9E9
| 356735 ||  || — || September 15, 2006 || Kitt Peak || Spacewatch || WIT || align=right data-sort-value="0.96" | 960 m || 
|-id=736 bgcolor=#fefefe
| 356736 ||  || — || January 26, 2006 || Kitt Peak || Spacewatch || — || align=right data-sort-value="0.84" | 840 m || 
|-id=737 bgcolor=#d6d6d6
| 356737 ||  || — || November 18, 2006 || Kitt Peak || Spacewatch || EOS || align=right | 2.9 km || 
|-id=738 bgcolor=#E9E9E9
| 356738 ||  || — || May 19, 2010 || Mount Lemmon || Mount Lemmon Survey || — || align=right | 1.7 km || 
|-id=739 bgcolor=#d6d6d6
| 356739 ||  || — || August 30, 2005 || Kitt Peak || Spacewatch || MRC || align=right | 2.7 km || 
|-id=740 bgcolor=#E9E9E9
| 356740 ||  || — || September 25, 2006 || Anderson Mesa || LONEOS || HEN || align=right | 1.3 km || 
|-id=741 bgcolor=#d6d6d6
| 356741 ||  || — || June 18, 2010 || Mount Lemmon || Mount Lemmon Survey || — || align=right | 4.0 km || 
|-id=742 bgcolor=#E9E9E9
| 356742 ||  || — || August 28, 2006 || Catalina || CSS || — || align=right | 2.3 km || 
|-id=743 bgcolor=#E9E9E9
| 356743 ||  || — || October 9, 2007 || Kitt Peak || Spacewatch || — || align=right data-sort-value="0.87" | 870 m || 
|-id=744 bgcolor=#E9E9E9
| 356744 ||  || — || October 18, 2007 || Kitt Peak || Spacewatch || — || align=right | 2.0 km || 
|-id=745 bgcolor=#E9E9E9
| 356745 ||  || — || December 21, 2003 || Kitt Peak || Spacewatch || PAD || align=right | 1.6 km || 
|-id=746 bgcolor=#d6d6d6
| 356746 ||  || — || November 20, 2006 || Kitt Peak || Spacewatch || — || align=right | 2.5 km || 
|-id=747 bgcolor=#d6d6d6
| 356747 ||  || — || September 26, 2005 || Kitt Peak || Spacewatch || — || align=right | 2.5 km || 
|-id=748 bgcolor=#E9E9E9
| 356748 ||  || — || September 11, 2002 || Palomar || NEAT || — || align=right | 1.5 km || 
|-id=749 bgcolor=#E9E9E9
| 356749 ||  || — || December 28, 2007 || Kitt Peak || Spacewatch || — || align=right | 1.6 km || 
|-id=750 bgcolor=#E9E9E9
| 356750 ||  || — || August 19, 2006 || Kitt Peak || Spacewatch || HEN || align=right | 1.2 km || 
|-id=751 bgcolor=#E9E9E9
| 356751 ||  || — || August 19, 2006 || Kitt Peak || Spacewatch || — || align=right | 1.7 km || 
|-id=752 bgcolor=#d6d6d6
| 356752 ||  || — || October 1, 2005 || Kitt Peak || Spacewatch || — || align=right | 2.9 km || 
|-id=753 bgcolor=#fefefe
| 356753 ||  || — || September 12, 2007 || Kitt Peak || Spacewatch || NYS || align=right data-sort-value="0.62" | 620 m || 
|-id=754 bgcolor=#d6d6d6
| 356754 ||  || — || September 30, 2005 || Mount Lemmon || Mount Lemmon Survey || THM || align=right | 2.3 km || 
|-id=755 bgcolor=#d6d6d6
| 356755 ||  || — || October 9, 2005 || Kitt Peak || Spacewatch || HYG || align=right | 2.6 km || 
|-id=756 bgcolor=#d6d6d6
| 356756 ||  || — || October 30, 2005 || Kitt Peak || Spacewatch || — || align=right | 3.5 km || 
|-id=757 bgcolor=#E9E9E9
| 356757 ||  || — || September 25, 2006 || Kitt Peak || Spacewatch || HOF || align=right | 2.4 km || 
|-id=758 bgcolor=#d6d6d6
| 356758 ||  || — || February 7, 2008 || Mount Lemmon || Mount Lemmon Survey || — || align=right | 2.9 km || 
|-id=759 bgcolor=#d6d6d6
| 356759 ||  || — || October 11, 2001 || Palomar || NEAT || — || align=right | 2.5 km || 
|-id=760 bgcolor=#E9E9E9
| 356760 ||  || — || August 19, 2006 || Kitt Peak || Spacewatch || — || align=right | 2.6 km || 
|-id=761 bgcolor=#d6d6d6
| 356761 ||  || — || April 14, 2008 || Mount Lemmon || Mount Lemmon Survey || LIX || align=right | 4.5 km || 
|-id=762 bgcolor=#fefefe
| 356762 ||  || — || September 21, 2000 || Haleakala || NEAT || — || align=right | 1.1 km || 
|-id=763 bgcolor=#d6d6d6
| 356763 ||  || — || November 24, 2000 || Kitt Peak || Spacewatch || HYG || align=right | 2.6 km || 
|-id=764 bgcolor=#E9E9E9
| 356764 ||  || — || December 16, 2007 || Mount Lemmon || Mount Lemmon Survey || — || align=right | 1.5 km || 
|-id=765 bgcolor=#d6d6d6
| 356765 ||  || — || October 13, 2006 || Kitt Peak || Spacewatch || — || align=right | 2.3 km || 
|-id=766 bgcolor=#E9E9E9
| 356766 ||  || — || December 28, 2003 || Kitt Peak || Spacewatch || — || align=right | 1.9 km || 
|-id=767 bgcolor=#E9E9E9
| 356767 ||  || — || March 15, 2009 || Kitt Peak || Spacewatch || NEM || align=right | 2.5 km || 
|-id=768 bgcolor=#E9E9E9
| 356768 ||  || — || January 15, 2004 || Kitt Peak || Spacewatch || — || align=right | 1.7 km || 
|-id=769 bgcolor=#d6d6d6
| 356769 ||  || — || February 28, 2008 || Kitt Peak || Spacewatch || HYG || align=right | 2.7 km || 
|-id=770 bgcolor=#fefefe
| 356770 ||  || — || October 9, 2007 || Kitt Peak || Spacewatch || — || align=right | 1.2 km || 
|-id=771 bgcolor=#d6d6d6
| 356771 ||  || — || September 28, 2006 || Kitt Peak || Spacewatch || EMA || align=right | 3.2 km || 
|-id=772 bgcolor=#d6d6d6
| 356772 ||  || — || December 21, 2006 || Kitt Peak || Spacewatch || — || align=right | 2.5 km || 
|-id=773 bgcolor=#E9E9E9
| 356773 ||  || — || August 28, 2006 || Kitt Peak || Spacewatch || — || align=right | 2.3 km || 
|-id=774 bgcolor=#E9E9E9
| 356774 ||  || — || October 1, 2011 || Kitt Peak || Spacewatch || — || align=right | 3.1 km || 
|-id=775 bgcolor=#d6d6d6
| 356775 ||  || — || June 19, 2010 || WISE || WISE || — || align=right | 4.1 km || 
|-id=776 bgcolor=#E9E9E9
| 356776 ||  || — || August 21, 2006 || Kitt Peak || Spacewatch || — || align=right | 2.1 km || 
|-id=777 bgcolor=#d6d6d6
| 356777 ||  || — || February 9, 2008 || Mount Lemmon || Mount Lemmon Survey || HYG || align=right | 2.7 km || 
|-id=778 bgcolor=#d6d6d6
| 356778 ||  || — || September 12, 2001 || Kitt Peak || Spacewatch || KOR || align=right | 1.3 km || 
|-id=779 bgcolor=#E9E9E9
| 356779 ||  || — || August 21, 2006 || Kitt Peak || Spacewatch || HOF || align=right | 2.6 km || 
|-id=780 bgcolor=#d6d6d6
| 356780 ||  || — || April 23, 2009 || Mount Lemmon || Mount Lemmon Survey || — || align=right | 4.0 km || 
|-id=781 bgcolor=#E9E9E9
| 356781 ||  || — || December 30, 2007 || Kitt Peak || Spacewatch || HEN || align=right | 1.4 km || 
|-id=782 bgcolor=#d6d6d6
| 356782 ||  || — || December 14, 2007 || Mount Lemmon || Mount Lemmon Survey || — || align=right | 3.7 km || 
|-id=783 bgcolor=#fefefe
| 356783 ||  || — || March 10, 2000 || Kitt Peak || Spacewatch || — || align=right data-sort-value="0.83" | 830 m || 
|-id=784 bgcolor=#E9E9E9
| 356784 ||  || — || March 8, 2005 || Mount Lemmon || Mount Lemmon Survey || — || align=right | 1.2 km || 
|-id=785 bgcolor=#E9E9E9
| 356785 ||  || — || August 29, 2006 || Kitt Peak || Spacewatch || — || align=right | 2.5 km || 
|-id=786 bgcolor=#E9E9E9
| 356786 ||  || — || November 9, 2007 || XuYi || PMO NEO || BRG || align=right | 1.7 km || 
|-id=787 bgcolor=#E9E9E9
| 356787 ||  || — || December 5, 2007 || Kitt Peak || Spacewatch || HOF || align=right | 2.7 km || 
|-id=788 bgcolor=#E9E9E9
| 356788 ||  || — || May 4, 2005 || Mount Lemmon || Mount Lemmon Survey || — || align=right | 2.2 km || 
|-id=789 bgcolor=#E9E9E9
| 356789 ||  || — || February 16, 2005 || La Silla || A. Boattini, H. Scholl || — || align=right | 2.3 km || 
|-id=790 bgcolor=#d6d6d6
| 356790 ||  || — || November 20, 2006 || Kitt Peak || Spacewatch || — || align=right | 3.1 km || 
|-id=791 bgcolor=#d6d6d6
| 356791 ||  || — || September 27, 2006 || Kitt Peak || Spacewatch || KOR || align=right | 1.3 km || 
|-id=792 bgcolor=#d6d6d6
| 356792 ||  || — || October 21, 1995 || Kitt Peak || Spacewatch || SHU3:2 || align=right | 4.6 km || 
|-id=793 bgcolor=#E9E9E9
| 356793 ||  || — || April 5, 2005 || Mount Lemmon || Mount Lemmon Survey || — || align=right | 1.8 km || 
|-id=794 bgcolor=#d6d6d6
| 356794 ||  || — || September 30, 2006 || Mount Lemmon || Mount Lemmon Survey || K-2 || align=right | 1.6 km || 
|-id=795 bgcolor=#E9E9E9
| 356795 ||  || — || August 28, 2006 || Catalina || CSS || GEF || align=right | 1.7 km || 
|-id=796 bgcolor=#d6d6d6
| 356796 ||  || — || July 25, 2000 || Kitt Peak || Spacewatch || — || align=right | 5.1 km || 
|-id=797 bgcolor=#E9E9E9
| 356797 ||  || — || September 19, 2006 || Kitt Peak || Spacewatch || HOF || align=right | 3.2 km || 
|-id=798 bgcolor=#d6d6d6
| 356798 ||  || — || February 7, 2008 || Mount Lemmon || Mount Lemmon Survey || — || align=right | 3.3 km || 
|-id=799 bgcolor=#d6d6d6
| 356799 ||  || — || April 3, 2008 || Mount Lemmon || Mount Lemmon Survey || — || align=right | 2.6 km || 
|-id=800 bgcolor=#E9E9E9
| 356800 ||  || — || January 20, 2009 || Mount Lemmon || Mount Lemmon Survey || MAR || align=right | 1.1 km || 
|}

356801–356900 

|-bgcolor=#d6d6d6
| 356801 ||  || — || October 1, 2005 || Kitt Peak || Spacewatch || — || align=right | 2.6 km || 
|-id=802 bgcolor=#d6d6d6
| 356802 ||  || — || July 5, 2005 || Mount Lemmon || Mount Lemmon Survey || — || align=right | 3.2 km || 
|-id=803 bgcolor=#fefefe
| 356803 ||  || — || August 9, 2004 || Campo Imperatore || CINEOS || — || align=right data-sort-value="0.81" | 810 m || 
|-id=804 bgcolor=#E9E9E9
| 356804 ||  || — || October 5, 2002 || Palomar || NEAT || — || align=right | 2.4 km || 
|-id=805 bgcolor=#E9E9E9
| 356805 ||  || — || May 10, 2005 || Kitt Peak || Spacewatch || — || align=right | 1.8 km || 
|-id=806 bgcolor=#E9E9E9
| 356806 ||  || — || March 9, 2005 || Catalina || CSS || MAR || align=right | 1.5 km || 
|-id=807 bgcolor=#fefefe
| 356807 ||  || — || February 24, 2006 || Mount Lemmon || Mount Lemmon Survey || FLO || align=right data-sort-value="0.74" | 740 m || 
|-id=808 bgcolor=#E9E9E9
| 356808 ||  || — || November 7, 2007 || Kitt Peak || Spacewatch || — || align=right | 2.2 km || 
|-id=809 bgcolor=#E9E9E9
| 356809 ||  || — || October 10, 2007 || Catalina || CSS || — || align=right | 1.2 km || 
|-id=810 bgcolor=#d6d6d6
| 356810 ||  || — || October 27, 2005 || Kitt Peak || Spacewatch || — || align=right | 3.3 km || 
|-id=811 bgcolor=#d6d6d6
| 356811 ||  || — || October 22, 2005 || Kitt Peak || Spacewatch || — || align=right | 4.0 km || 
|-id=812 bgcolor=#E9E9E9
| 356812 ||  || — || February 27, 2009 || Kitt Peak || Spacewatch || — || align=right | 2.1 km || 
|-id=813 bgcolor=#E9E9E9
| 356813 ||  || — || November 11, 2007 || Mount Lemmon || Mount Lemmon Survey || HEN || align=right | 1.5 km || 
|-id=814 bgcolor=#d6d6d6
| 356814 ||  || — || April 4, 2003 || Kitt Peak || Spacewatch || — || align=right | 3.7 km || 
|-id=815 bgcolor=#d6d6d6
| 356815 ||  || — || November 21, 2006 || Mount Lemmon || Mount Lemmon Survey || — || align=right | 3.0 km || 
|-id=816 bgcolor=#d6d6d6
| 356816 ||  || — || October 3, 2006 || Mount Lemmon || Mount Lemmon Survey || K-2 || align=right | 1.3 km || 
|-id=817 bgcolor=#E9E9E9
| 356817 ||  || — || January 19, 2004 || Kitt Peak || Spacewatch || — || align=right | 1.6 km || 
|-id=818 bgcolor=#E9E9E9
| 356818 ||  || — || March 13, 2005 || Kitt Peak || Spacewatch || — || align=right | 1.2 km || 
|-id=819 bgcolor=#d6d6d6
| 356819 ||  || — || February 7, 2002 || Palomar || NEAT || — || align=right | 4.0 km || 
|-id=820 bgcolor=#E9E9E9
| 356820 ||  || — || September 17, 2006 || Kitt Peak || Spacewatch || HOF || align=right | 4.0 km || 
|-id=821 bgcolor=#d6d6d6
| 356821 ||  || — || August 27, 2005 || Palomar || NEAT || — || align=right | 3.0 km || 
|-id=822 bgcolor=#d6d6d6
| 356822 ||  || — || September 1, 2005 || Kitt Peak || Spacewatch || — || align=right | 3.8 km || 
|-id=823 bgcolor=#E9E9E9
| 356823 ||  || — || May 2, 2005 || Kitt Peak || Spacewatch || HNS || align=right | 1.5 km || 
|-id=824 bgcolor=#d6d6d6
| 356824 ||  || — || April 7, 2008 || Mount Lemmon || Mount Lemmon Survey || 7:4 || align=right | 3.7 km || 
|-id=825 bgcolor=#d6d6d6
| 356825 ||  || — || November 22, 2006 || Kitt Peak || Spacewatch || — || align=right | 3.5 km || 
|-id=826 bgcolor=#E9E9E9
| 356826 ||  || — || August 27, 2006 || Kitt Peak || Spacewatch || PAD || align=right | 1.9 km || 
|-id=827 bgcolor=#d6d6d6
| 356827 ||  || — || December 23, 2006 || Bergisch Gladbac || W. Bickel || EOS || align=right | 2.3 km || 
|-id=828 bgcolor=#d6d6d6
| 356828 ||  || — || February 2, 2008 || Kitt Peak || Spacewatch || — || align=right | 3.2 km || 
|-id=829 bgcolor=#d6d6d6
| 356829 ||  || — || July 29, 2005 || Palomar || NEAT || EUP || align=right | 4.7 km || 
|-id=830 bgcolor=#d6d6d6
| 356830 ||  || — || February 10, 2002 || Socorro || LINEAR || — || align=right | 4.1 km || 
|-id=831 bgcolor=#E9E9E9
| 356831 ||  || — || November 18, 2007 || Kitt Peak || Spacewatch || — || align=right | 1.9 km || 
|-id=832 bgcolor=#d6d6d6
| 356832 ||  || — || March 1, 2008 || Kitt Peak || Spacewatch || — || align=right | 3.7 km || 
|-id=833 bgcolor=#d6d6d6
| 356833 ||  || — || September 1, 2005 || Anderson Mesa || LONEOS || — || align=right | 3.3 km || 
|-id=834 bgcolor=#d6d6d6
| 356834 ||  || — || February 28, 2008 || Mount Lemmon || Mount Lemmon Survey || — || align=right | 4.1 km || 
|-id=835 bgcolor=#d6d6d6
| 356835 ||  || — || August 4, 2005 || Palomar || NEAT || — || align=right | 3.0 km || 
|-id=836 bgcolor=#d6d6d6
| 356836 ||  || — || January 5, 2002 || Kitt Peak || Spacewatch || EOS || align=right | 2.2 km || 
|-id=837 bgcolor=#d6d6d6
| 356837 ||  || — || July 5, 2005 || Palomar || NEAT || — || align=right | 3.7 km || 
|-id=838 bgcolor=#E9E9E9
| 356838 ||  || — || September 26, 2006 || Catalina || CSS || NEM || align=right | 2.8 km || 
|-id=839 bgcolor=#E9E9E9
| 356839 ||  || — || July 23, 2001 || Fort Davis || J. G. Ries || NEM || align=right | 2.3 km || 
|-id=840 bgcolor=#E9E9E9
| 356840 ||  || — || November 16, 1998 || Kitt Peak || Spacewatch || — || align=right | 1.8 km || 
|-id=841 bgcolor=#d6d6d6
| 356841 ||  || — || February 8, 2002 || Kitt Peak || Spacewatch || — || align=right | 2.8 km || 
|-id=842 bgcolor=#E9E9E9
| 356842 ||  || — || March 19, 2009 || Mount Lemmon || Mount Lemmon Survey || NEM || align=right | 2.3 km || 
|-id=843 bgcolor=#d6d6d6
| 356843 ||  || — || February 8, 2002 || Kitt Peak || Spacewatch || — || align=right | 3.7 km || 
|-id=844 bgcolor=#d6d6d6
| 356844 ||  || — || November 5, 2005 || Kitt Peak || Spacewatch || — || align=right | 3.6 km || 
|-id=845 bgcolor=#E9E9E9
| 356845 ||  || — || March 17, 2004 || Kitt Peak || Spacewatch || — || align=right | 2.2 km || 
|-id=846 bgcolor=#d6d6d6
| 356846 ||  || — || April 29, 2003 || Kitt Peak || Spacewatch || — || align=right | 3.5 km || 
|-id=847 bgcolor=#d6d6d6
| 356847 ||  || — || October 11, 2005 || Kitt Peak || Spacewatch || — || align=right | 2.7 km || 
|-id=848 bgcolor=#d6d6d6
| 356848 ||  || — || October 20, 2006 || Kitt Peak || Spacewatch || K-2 || align=right | 1.3 km || 
|-id=849 bgcolor=#d6d6d6
| 356849 ||  || — || April 24, 2004 || Kitt Peak || Spacewatch || KOR || align=right | 1.4 km || 
|-id=850 bgcolor=#d6d6d6
| 356850 ||  || — || June 8, 2005 || Siding Spring || SSS || TIR || align=right | 4.9 km || 
|-id=851 bgcolor=#E9E9E9
| 356851 ||  || — || January 13, 2004 || Anderson Mesa || LONEOS || AER || align=right | 4.1 km || 
|-id=852 bgcolor=#E9E9E9
| 356852 ||  || — || September 19, 2006 || Catalina || CSS || MRX || align=right | 1.1 km || 
|-id=853 bgcolor=#E9E9E9
| 356853 ||  || — || August 12, 2006 || Palomar || NEAT || — || align=right | 3.3 km || 
|-id=854 bgcolor=#E9E9E9
| 356854 ||  || — || November 4, 2007 || Kitt Peak || Spacewatch || — || align=right data-sort-value="0.89" | 890 m || 
|-id=855 bgcolor=#E9E9E9
| 356855 ||  || — || September 28, 2006 || Kitt Peak || Spacewatch || — || align=right | 2.9 km || 
|-id=856 bgcolor=#E9E9E9
| 356856 ||  || — || June 18, 2010 || Mount Lemmon || Mount Lemmon Survey || — || align=right | 2.7 km || 
|-id=857 bgcolor=#E9E9E9
| 356857 ||  || — || November 6, 2007 || Mount Lemmon || Mount Lemmon Survey || PAD || align=right | 1.9 km || 
|-id=858 bgcolor=#d6d6d6
| 356858 ||  || — || September 26, 2005 || Palomar || NEAT || — || align=right | 4.6 km || 
|-id=859 bgcolor=#d6d6d6
| 356859 ||  || — || September 26, 2006 || Catalina || CSS || 615 || align=right | 1.8 km || 
|-id=860 bgcolor=#d6d6d6
| 356860 ||  || — || March 7, 2008 || Mount Lemmon || Mount Lemmon Survey || HYG || align=right | 3.4 km || 
|-id=861 bgcolor=#d6d6d6
| 356861 ||  || — || October 18, 2006 || Kitt Peak || Spacewatch || KOR || align=right | 1.4 km || 
|-id=862 bgcolor=#d6d6d6
| 356862 ||  || — || December 1, 2006 || Kitt Peak || Spacewatch || — || align=right | 2.8 km || 
|-id=863 bgcolor=#d6d6d6
| 356863 Maathai ||  ||  || June 25, 2010 || WISE || WISE || 3:2 || align=right | 4.1 km || 
|-id=864 bgcolor=#C2FFFF
| 356864 ||  || — || September 18, 2010 || Mount Lemmon || Mount Lemmon Survey || L4 || align=right | 8.6 km || 
|-id=865 bgcolor=#d6d6d6
| 356865 ||  || — || June 17, 2010 || WISE || WISE || — || align=right | 4.0 km || 
|-id=866 bgcolor=#d6d6d6
| 356866 ||  || — || December 13, 2006 || Mount Lemmon || Mount Lemmon Survey || — || align=right | 3.5 km || 
|-id=867 bgcolor=#E9E9E9
| 356867 ||  || — || September 28, 2006 || Kitt Peak || Spacewatch || MRX || align=right | 1.2 km || 
|-id=868 bgcolor=#d6d6d6
| 356868 ||  || — || May 5, 2008 || Mount Lemmon || Mount Lemmon Survey || THB || align=right | 3.7 km || 
|-id=869 bgcolor=#E9E9E9
| 356869 ||  || — || June 13, 2010 || Mount Lemmon || Mount Lemmon Survey || — || align=right | 1.8 km || 
|-id=870 bgcolor=#E9E9E9
| 356870 ||  || — || February 14, 2004 || Kitt Peak || Spacewatch || — || align=right | 1.8 km || 
|-id=871 bgcolor=#E9E9E9
| 356871 ||  || — || April 22, 2009 || Kitt Peak || Spacewatch || — || align=right | 3.4 km || 
|-id=872 bgcolor=#E9E9E9
| 356872 ||  || — || December 18, 2007 || Mount Lemmon || Mount Lemmon Survey || — || align=right | 2.9 km || 
|-id=873 bgcolor=#d6d6d6
| 356873 ||  || — || March 11, 2008 || Catalina || CSS || URS || align=right | 6.4 km || 
|-id=874 bgcolor=#d6d6d6
| 356874 ||  || — || December 26, 2006 || Catalina || CSS || — || align=right | 5.1 km || 
|-id=875 bgcolor=#d6d6d6
| 356875 ||  || — || March 15, 2008 || Kitt Peak || Spacewatch || — || align=right | 5.2 km || 
|-id=876 bgcolor=#d6d6d6
| 356876 ||  || — || November 18, 2000 || Anderson Mesa || LONEOS || URS || align=right | 4.9 km || 
|-id=877 bgcolor=#d6d6d6
| 356877 ||  || — || October 27, 2005 || Catalina || CSS || — || align=right | 4.0 km || 
|-id=878 bgcolor=#d6d6d6
| 356878 ||  || — || September 26, 2005 || Kitt Peak || Spacewatch || — || align=right | 3.5 km || 
|-id=879 bgcolor=#d6d6d6
| 356879 ||  || — || April 1, 2008 || Mount Lemmon || Mount Lemmon Survey || EOS || align=right | 2.9 km || 
|-id=880 bgcolor=#d6d6d6
| 356880 ||  || — || March 23, 2003 || Apache Point || SDSS || — || align=right | 4.5 km || 
|-id=881 bgcolor=#d6d6d6
| 356881 ||  || — || October 25, 2005 || Mount Lemmon || Mount Lemmon Survey || — || align=right | 2.7 km || 
|-id=882 bgcolor=#E9E9E9
| 356882 ||  || — || April 5, 2005 || Palomar || NEAT || ADE || align=right | 3.0 km || 
|-id=883 bgcolor=#d6d6d6
| 356883 ||  || — || September 15, 2004 || Kitt Peak || Spacewatch || 7:4 || align=right | 4.5 km || 
|-id=884 bgcolor=#E9E9E9
| 356884 ||  || — || November 12, 2007 || Catalina || CSS || ADE || align=right | 2.6 km || 
|-id=885 bgcolor=#E9E9E9
| 356885 ||  || — || March 15, 2004 || Catalina || CSS || MRX || align=right | 1.3 km || 
|-id=886 bgcolor=#d6d6d6
| 356886 ||  || — || February 6, 2002 || Socorro || LINEAR || — || align=right | 4.7 km || 
|-id=887 bgcolor=#d6d6d6
| 356887 ||  || — || September 1, 2005 || Kitt Peak || Spacewatch || — || align=right | 2.7 km || 
|-id=888 bgcolor=#E9E9E9
| 356888 ||  || — || February 16, 2004 || Kitt Peak || Spacewatch || — || align=right | 3.1 km || 
|-id=889 bgcolor=#d6d6d6
| 356889 ||  || — || July 9, 2005 || Kitt Peak || Spacewatch || NAE || align=right | 3.5 km || 
|-id=890 bgcolor=#d6d6d6
| 356890 ||  || — || March 11, 2002 || Palomar || NEAT || — || align=right | 3.9 km || 
|-id=891 bgcolor=#E9E9E9
| 356891 ||  || — || April 20, 2006 || Mount Lemmon || Mount Lemmon Survey || — || align=right | 2.4 km || 
|-id=892 bgcolor=#d6d6d6
| 356892 ||  || — || June 12, 2005 || Kitt Peak || Spacewatch || — || align=right | 2.7 km || 
|-id=893 bgcolor=#C2FFFF
| 356893 ||  || — || February 14, 2002 || Kitt Peak || Spacewatch || L4 || align=right | 12 km || 
|-id=894 bgcolor=#d6d6d6
| 356894 ||  || — || November 21, 2006 || Mount Lemmon || Mount Lemmon Survey || URS || align=right | 3.6 km || 
|-id=895 bgcolor=#C2FFFF
| 356895 ||  || — || December 12, 1999 || Socorro || LINEAR || L4 || align=right | 13 km || 
|-id=896 bgcolor=#C2FFFF
| 356896 ||  || — || October 10, 2008 || Mount Lemmon || Mount Lemmon Survey || L4 || align=right | 11 km || 
|-id=897 bgcolor=#C2FFFF
| 356897 ||  || — || November 24, 2009 || Catalina || CSS || L4 || align=right | 15 km || 
|-id=898 bgcolor=#C2FFFF
| 356898 ||  || — || September 29, 2009 || Mount Lemmon || Mount Lemmon Survey || L4 || align=right | 7.7 km || 
|-id=899 bgcolor=#C2FFFF
| 356899 ||  || — || July 29, 2008 || Kitt Peak || Spacewatch || L4 || align=right | 9.9 km || 
|-id=900 bgcolor=#C2FFFF
| 356900 ||  || — || January 5, 2000 || Kitt Peak || Spacewatch || L4 || align=right | 8.2 km || 
|}

356901–357000 

|-bgcolor=#C2FFFF
| 356901 ||  || — || January 12, 2000 || Kitt Peak || Spacewatch || L4 || align=right | 10 km || 
|-id=902 bgcolor=#C2FFFF
| 356902 ||  || — || September 5, 2008 || Kitt Peak || Spacewatch || L4ERY || align=right | 7.7 km || 
|-id=903 bgcolor=#C2FFFF
| 356903 ||  || — || May 27, 2003 || Kitt Peak || Spacewatch || L4 || align=right | 11 km || 
|-id=904 bgcolor=#C2FFFF
| 356904 ||  || — || October 29, 2010 || Kitt Peak || Spacewatch || L4 || align=right | 10 km || 
|-id=905 bgcolor=#C2FFFF
| 356905 ||  || — || October 1, 2009 || Mount Lemmon || Mount Lemmon Survey || L4ERY || align=right | 7.8 km || 
|-id=906 bgcolor=#C2FFFF
| 356906 ||  || — || March 21, 2002 || Kitt Peak || Spacewatch || L4 || align=right | 9.1 km || 
|-id=907 bgcolor=#C2FFFF
| 356907 ||  || — || May 25, 2007 || Kitt Peak || Spacewatch || L4 || align=right | 8.8 km || 
|-id=908 bgcolor=#d6d6d6
| 356908 ||  || — || November 25, 2005 || Catalina || CSS || EOS || align=right | 2.7 km || 
|-id=909 bgcolor=#C2FFFF
| 356909 ||  || — || April 22, 2004 || Apache Point || SDSS || L4 || align=right | 14 km || 
|-id=910 bgcolor=#C2FFFF
| 356910 ||  || — || February 8, 2010 || WISE || WISE || L4 || align=right | 12 km || 
|-id=911 bgcolor=#C2FFFF
| 356911 ||  || — || September 5, 2008 || Kitt Peak || Spacewatch || L4 || align=right | 8.4 km || 
|-id=912 bgcolor=#C2FFFF
| 356912 ||  || — || September 5, 2008 || Kitt Peak || Spacewatch || L4 || align=right | 10 km || 
|-id=913 bgcolor=#C2FFFF
| 356913 ||  || — || October 17, 2008 || Kitt Peak || Spacewatch || L4ERY || align=right | 8.6 km || 
|-id=914 bgcolor=#C2FFFF
| 356914 ||  || — || October 6, 2008 || Mount Lemmon || Mount Lemmon Survey || L4 || align=right | 9.1 km || 
|-id=915 bgcolor=#C2FFFF
| 356915 ||  || — || September 11, 2007 || Mount Lemmon || Mount Lemmon Survey || L4 || align=right | 7.9 km || 
|-id=916 bgcolor=#C2FFFF
| 356916 ||  || — || February 16, 2001 || Cima Ekar || ADAS || L4 || align=right | 8.3 km || 
|-id=917 bgcolor=#d6d6d6
| 356917 ||  || — || September 13, 2004 || Kitt Peak || Spacewatch || — || align=right | 3.2 km || 
|-id=918 bgcolor=#C2FFFF
| 356918 ||  || — || January 16, 2000 || Kitt Peak || Spacewatch || L4 || align=right | 7.8 km || 
|-id=919 bgcolor=#d6d6d6
| 356919 ||  || — || October 4, 2004 || Palomar || NEAT || EOS || align=right | 2.8 km || 
|-id=920 bgcolor=#d6d6d6
| 356920 ||  || — || September 17, 2004 || Kitt Peak || Spacewatch || — || align=right | 3.0 km || 
|-id=921 bgcolor=#d6d6d6
| 356921 ||  || — || January 4, 2006 || Mount Lemmon || Mount Lemmon Survey || — || align=right | 4.2 km || 
|-id=922 bgcolor=#d6d6d6
| 356922 ||  || — || April 12, 2002 || Palomar || NEAT || — || align=right | 3.7 km || 
|-id=923 bgcolor=#d6d6d6
| 356923 ||  || — || September 28, 2009 || Mount Lemmon || Mount Lemmon Survey || — || align=right | 3.8 km || 
|-id=924 bgcolor=#E9E9E9
| 356924 ||  || — || October 15, 2001 || Palomar || NEAT || — || align=right | 2.2 km || 
|-id=925 bgcolor=#fefefe
| 356925 ||  || — || June 29, 2005 || Catalina || CSS || — || align=right | 1.1 km || 
|-id=926 bgcolor=#E9E9E9
| 356926 ||  || — || February 2, 2005 || Kitt Peak || Spacewatch || — || align=right | 3.5 km || 
|-id=927 bgcolor=#fefefe
| 356927 ||  || — || April 11, 2003 || Kitt Peak || Spacewatch || — || align=right | 1.5 km || 
|-id=928 bgcolor=#E9E9E9
| 356928 ||  || — || October 9, 1999 || Socorro || LINEAR || — || align=right | 2.4 km || 
|-id=929 bgcolor=#fefefe
| 356929 ||  || — || March 12, 2007 || Mount Lemmon || Mount Lemmon Survey || — || align=right | 1.2 km || 
|-id=930 bgcolor=#E9E9E9
| 356930 ||  || — || March 26, 2001 || Kitt Peak || M. W. Buie || AGN || align=right | 1.3 km || 
|-id=931 bgcolor=#d6d6d6
| 356931 ||  || — || April 6, 2005 || Mount Lemmon || Mount Lemmon Survey || KOR || align=right | 1.4 km || 
|-id=932 bgcolor=#d6d6d6
| 356932 ||  || — || October 10, 2002 || Apache Point || SDSS || KOR || align=right | 1.5 km || 
|-id=933 bgcolor=#d6d6d6
| 356933 ||  || — || June 1, 2006 || Mount Lemmon || Mount Lemmon Survey || — || align=right | 3.4 km || 
|-id=934 bgcolor=#C2FFFF
| 356934 ||  || — || March 19, 2007 || Mount Lemmon || Mount Lemmon Survey || L5 || align=right | 14 km || 
|-id=935 bgcolor=#d6d6d6
| 356935 ||  || — || November 19, 2001 || Socorro || LINEAR || HYG || align=right | 3.3 km || 
|-id=936 bgcolor=#fefefe
| 356936 ||  || — || December 18, 2001 || Socorro || LINEAR || — || align=right | 2.6 km || 
|-id=937 bgcolor=#fefefe
| 356937 ||  || — || September 19, 2001 || Socorro || LINEAR || — || align=right data-sort-value="0.77" | 770 m || 
|-id=938 bgcolor=#E9E9E9
| 356938 ||  || — || December 15, 2004 || Kitt Peak || Spacewatch || — || align=right | 1.9 km || 
|-id=939 bgcolor=#fefefe
| 356939 ||  || — || March 30, 2008 || Kitt Peak || Spacewatch || — || align=right data-sort-value="0.99" | 990 m || 
|-id=940 bgcolor=#d6d6d6
| 356940 ||  || — || August 25, 1995 || Kitt Peak || Spacewatch || — || align=right | 3.8 km || 
|-id=941 bgcolor=#E9E9E9
| 356941 ||  || — || September 22, 2003 || Palomar || NEAT || — || align=right | 2.8 km || 
|-id=942 bgcolor=#d6d6d6
| 356942 ||  || — || September 28, 2006 || Kitt Peak || Spacewatch || — || align=right | 3.2 km || 
|-id=943 bgcolor=#E9E9E9
| 356943 ||  || — || October 25, 2003 || Socorro || LINEAR || — || align=right | 2.9 km || 
|-id=944 bgcolor=#E9E9E9
| 356944 ||  || — || January 6, 2005 || Catalina || CSS || — || align=right | 1.6 km || 
|-id=945 bgcolor=#d6d6d6
| 356945 ||  || — || September 15, 2007 || Mount Lemmon || Mount Lemmon Survey || EOS || align=right | 2.2 km || 
|-id=946 bgcolor=#E9E9E9
| 356946 ||  || — || March 17, 2005 || Mount Lemmon || Mount Lemmon Survey || — || align=right | 2.6 km || 
|-id=947 bgcolor=#fefefe
| 356947 ||  || — || October 1, 2005 || Catalina || CSS || FLO || align=right data-sort-value="0.67" | 670 m || 
|-id=948 bgcolor=#FA8072
| 356948 ||  || — || September 22, 2009 || Mount Lemmon || Mount Lemmon Survey || — || align=right data-sort-value="0.59" | 590 m || 
|-id=949 bgcolor=#fefefe
| 356949 ||  || — || February 10, 2002 || Socorro || LINEAR || MAS || align=right data-sort-value="0.81" | 810 m || 
|-id=950 bgcolor=#d6d6d6
| 356950 ||  || — || February 7, 2003 || Palomar || NEAT || TIR || align=right | 4.2 km || 
|-id=951 bgcolor=#FA8072
| 356951 ||  || — || April 28, 2003 || Anderson Mesa || LONEOS || H || align=right data-sort-value="0.89" | 890 m || 
|-id=952 bgcolor=#E9E9E9
| 356952 ||  || — || November 24, 2003 || Kitt Peak || Spacewatch || NEM || align=right | 2.6 km || 
|-id=953 bgcolor=#d6d6d6
| 356953 ||  || — || September 16, 2006 || Catalina || CSS || — || align=right | 4.0 km || 
|-id=954 bgcolor=#E9E9E9
| 356954 ||  || — || December 12, 2004 || Kitt Peak || Spacewatch || — || align=right | 1.3 km || 
|-id=955 bgcolor=#E9E9E9
| 356955 ||  || — || July 22, 2003 || Haleakala || NEAT || — || align=right | 2.1 km || 
|-id=956 bgcolor=#fefefe
| 356956 ||  || — || September 19, 2001 || Palomar || NEAT || NYS || align=right data-sort-value="0.87" | 870 m || 
|-id=957 bgcolor=#d6d6d6
| 356957 ||  || — || September 27, 2000 || Kitt Peak || Spacewatch || — || align=right | 3.6 km || 
|-id=958 bgcolor=#E9E9E9
| 356958 ||  || — || September 28, 1998 || Caussols || ODAS || GEF || align=right | 1.6 km || 
|-id=959 bgcolor=#E9E9E9
| 356959 ||  || — || December 11, 2004 || Kitt Peak || Spacewatch || — || align=right | 1.2 km || 
|-id=960 bgcolor=#d6d6d6
| 356960 ||  || — || January 12, 2002 || Kitt Peak || Spacewatch || — || align=right | 4.2 km || 
|-id=961 bgcolor=#fefefe
| 356961 ||  || — || April 19, 2006 || Mount Lemmon || Mount Lemmon Survey || H || align=right data-sort-value="0.73" | 730 m || 
|-id=962 bgcolor=#C2FFFF
| 356962 ||  || — || May 14, 2004 || Kitt Peak || Spacewatch || L4 || align=right | 11 km || 
|-id=963 bgcolor=#d6d6d6
| 356963 ||  || — || December 14, 2001 || Socorro || LINEAR || — || align=right | 3.1 km || 
|-id=964 bgcolor=#E9E9E9
| 356964 ||  || — || December 9, 2004 || Kitt Peak || Spacewatch || — || align=right | 1.5 km || 
|-id=965 bgcolor=#fefefe
| 356965 ||  || — || December 31, 2008 || Mount Lemmon || Mount Lemmon Survey || — || align=right | 1.1 km || 
|-id=966 bgcolor=#fefefe
| 356966 ||  || — || March 14, 2005 || Catalina || CSS || H || align=right | 1.1 km || 
|-id=967 bgcolor=#fefefe
| 356967 ||  || — || March 14, 2002 || Socorro || LINEAR || — || align=right | 1.6 km || 
|-id=968 bgcolor=#d6d6d6
| 356968 ||  || — || February 11, 2002 || Socorro || LINEAR || HYG || align=right | 3.4 km || 
|-id=969 bgcolor=#E9E9E9
| 356969 ||  || — || November 20, 2008 || Mount Lemmon || Mount Lemmon Survey || — || align=right | 1.1 km || 
|-id=970 bgcolor=#E9E9E9
| 356970 ||  || — || March 6, 1981 || Siding Spring || S. J. Bus || — || align=right | 2.6 km || 
|-id=971 bgcolor=#FA8072
| 356971 ||  || — || October 10, 1991 || Palomar || E. F. Helin || — || align=right | 2.5 km || 
|-id=972 bgcolor=#fefefe
| 356972 ||  || — || August 16, 1993 || Kitt Peak || Spacewatch || — || align=right data-sort-value="0.62" | 620 m || 
|-id=973 bgcolor=#fefefe
| 356973 ||  || — || February 15, 1994 || Kitt Peak || Spacewatch || — || align=right data-sort-value="0.79" | 790 m || 
|-id=974 bgcolor=#d6d6d6
| 356974 ||  || — || September 28, 1994 || Kitt Peak || Spacewatch || — || align=right | 2.9 km || 
|-id=975 bgcolor=#d6d6d6
| 356975 Aspriliopacelli ||  ||  || October 9, 1994 || Stroncone || Santa Lucia Obs. || — || align=right | 6.3 km || 
|-id=976 bgcolor=#E9E9E9
| 356976 ||  || — || February 24, 1995 || Kitt Peak || Spacewatch || CLO || align=right | 2.0 km || 
|-id=977 bgcolor=#fefefe
| 356977 ||  || — || September 25, 1995 || Kitt Peak || Spacewatch || — || align=right data-sort-value="0.47" | 470 m || 
|-id=978 bgcolor=#d6d6d6
| 356978 ||  || — || September 18, 1995 || Kitt Peak || Spacewatch || — || align=right | 2.1 km || 
|-id=979 bgcolor=#fefefe
| 356979 ||  || — || October 15, 1995 || Kitt Peak || Spacewatch || — || align=right data-sort-value="0.56" | 560 m || 
|-id=980 bgcolor=#d6d6d6
| 356980 ||  || — || January 12, 1996 || Kitt Peak || Spacewatch || — || align=right | 3.4 km || 
|-id=981 bgcolor=#fefefe
| 356981 ||  || — || September 6, 1996 || Kitt Peak || Spacewatch || — || align=right data-sort-value="0.62" | 620 m || 
|-id=982 bgcolor=#fefefe
| 356982 ||  || — || September 7, 1996 || Nanyo || T. Okuni || — || align=right | 1.1 km || 
|-id=983 bgcolor=#d6d6d6
| 356983 ||  || — || March 4, 1997 || Kitt Peak || Spacewatch || — || align=right | 2.9 km || 
|-id=984 bgcolor=#d6d6d6
| 356984 ||  || — || April 7, 1997 || Kitt Peak || Spacewatch || — || align=right | 2.3 km || 
|-id=985 bgcolor=#E9E9E9
| 356985 ||  || — || September 16, 1997 || Modra || A. Galád, A. Pravda || — || align=right | 1.1 km || 
|-id=986 bgcolor=#fefefe
| 356986 ||  || — || September 26, 1997 || Ondřejov || P. Pravec || — || align=right | 1.2 km || 
|-id=987 bgcolor=#C2FFFF
| 356987 ||  || — || October 23, 1997 || Kitt Peak || Spacewatch || L4 || align=right | 12 km || 
|-id=988 bgcolor=#fefefe
| 356988 ||  || — || January 26, 1998 || Kitt Peak || Spacewatch || — || align=right data-sort-value="0.66" | 660 m || 
|-id=989 bgcolor=#fefefe
| 356989 ||  || — || March 18, 1998 || Kitt Peak || Spacewatch || V || align=right data-sort-value="0.69" | 690 m || 
|-id=990 bgcolor=#d6d6d6
| 356990 ||  || — || May 22, 1998 || Kitt Peak || Spacewatch || — || align=right | 3.0 km || 
|-id=991 bgcolor=#FFC2E0
| 356991 ||  || — || August 19, 1998 || Socorro || LINEAR || APOPHAcritical || align=right data-sort-value="0.59" | 590 m || 
|-id=992 bgcolor=#E9E9E9
| 356992 ||  || — || August 22, 1998 || Xinglong || SCAP || EUN || align=right | 1.6 km || 
|-id=993 bgcolor=#d6d6d6
| 356993 ||  || — || September 14, 1998 || Kitt Peak || Spacewatch || — || align=right | 3.6 km || 
|-id=994 bgcolor=#fefefe
| 356994 ||  || — || September 14, 1998 || Socorro || LINEAR || — || align=right data-sort-value="0.70" | 700 m || 
|-id=995 bgcolor=#E9E9E9
| 356995 ||  || — || September 20, 1998 || Kitt Peak || Spacewatch || — || align=right | 1.3 km || 
|-id=996 bgcolor=#d6d6d6
| 356996 ||  || — || September 2, 1998 || Kitt Peak || Spacewatch || EUP || align=right | 4.9 km || 
|-id=997 bgcolor=#E9E9E9
| 356997 ||  || — || September 26, 1998 || Socorro || LINEAR || — || align=right | 1.5 km || 
|-id=998 bgcolor=#d6d6d6
| 356998 ||  || — || September 26, 1998 || Socorro || LINEAR || EUP || align=right | 7.2 km || 
|-id=999 bgcolor=#E9E9E9
| 356999 ||  || — || October 14, 1998 || Xinglong || SCAP || — || align=right | 1.6 km || 
|-id=000 bgcolor=#E9E9E9
| 357000 || 1998 UO || — || October 17, 1998 || Prescott || P. G. Comba || — || align=right | 1.7 km || 
|}

References

External links 
 Discovery Circumstances: Numbered Minor Planets (355001)–(360000) (IAU Minor Planet Center)

0356